= Glossary of areas of mathematics =

Mathematics is a broad subject that is commonly divided in many areas or branches that may be defined by their objects of study, by the used methods, or by both. For example, analytic number theory is a subarea of number theory devoted to the use of methods of analysis for the study of natural numbers.

This glossary is alphabetically sorted. This hides a large part of the relationships between areas. For the broadest areas of mathematics, see Mathematics § Areas of mathematics. The Mathematics Subject Classification is a hierarchical list of areas and subjects of study that has been elaborated by the community of mathematicians. It is used by most publishers for classifying mathematical articles and books.

== A ==
Absolute differential calculus
An older name of Ricci calculus
Absolute geometry
Also called neutral geometry, a synthetic geometry similar to Euclidean geometry but without the parallel postulate.
Abstract algebra
The part of algebra devoted to the study of algebraic structures in themselves. Occasionally named modern algebra in course titles.
Abstract analytic number theory
The study of arithmetic semigroups as a means to extend notions from classical analytic number theory.
Abstract differential geometry
A form of differential geometry without the notion of smoothness from calculus. Instead it is built using sheaf theory and sheaf cohomology.
Abstract harmonic analysis
A modern branch of harmonic analysis that extends upon the generalized Fourier transforms that can be defined on locally compact groups.
Abstract homotopy theory
A part of topology that deals with homotopic functions, i.e. functions from one topological space to another which are homotopic (the functions can be deformed into one another).
Actuarial science
The discipline that applies mathematical and statistical methods to assess risk in insurance, finance and other industries and professions. More generally, actuaries apply rigorous mathematics to model matters of uncertainty.
Additive combinatorics
The part of arithmetic combinatorics devoted to the operations of addition and subtraction.
Additive number theory
A part of number theory that studies subsets of integers and their behaviour under addition.
Affine geometry
A branch of geometry that deals with properties that are independent from distances and angles, such as alignment and parallelism.
Affine geometry of curves
The study of curve properties that are invariant under affine transformations.
Affine differential geometry
A type of differential geometry dedicated to differential invariants under volume-preserving affine transformations.
Ahlfors theory
A part of complex analysis being the geometric counterpart of Nevanlinna theory. It was invented by Lars Ahlfors.
Algebra
One of the major areas of mathematics. Roughly speaking, it is the art of manipulating and computing with operations acting on symbols called variables that represent indeterminate numbers or other mathematical objects, such as vectors, matrices, or elements of algebraic structures.
Algebraic analysis
motivated by systems of linear partial differential equations, it is a branch of algebraic geometry and algebraic topology that uses methods from sheaf theory and complex analysis, to study the properties and generalizations of functions. It was started by Mikio Sato.
Algebraic combinatorics
an area that employs methods of abstract algebra to problems of combinatorics. It also refers to the application of methods from combinatorics to problems in abstract algebra.
Algebraic computation
An older name of computer algebra.
Algebraic geometry
a branch that combines techniques from abstract algebra with the language and problems of geometry. Fundamentally, it studies algebraic varieties.
Algebraic graph theory
a branch of graph theory in which methods are taken from algebra and employed to problems about graphs. The methods are commonly taken from group theory and linear algebra.
Algebraic K-theory
an important part of homological algebra concerned with defining and applying a certain sequence of functors from rings to abelian groups.
Algebraic number theory
The part of number theory devoted to the use of algebraic methods, mainly those of commutative algebra, for the study of number fields and their rings of integers.
Algebraic statistics
the use of algebra to advance statistics, although the term is sometimes restricted to label the use of algebraic geometry and commutative algebra in statistics.
Algebraic topology
a branch that uses tools from abstract algebra for topology to study topological spaces.
Algorithmic number theory
also known as computational number theory, it is the study of algorithms for performing number theoretic computations.
Anabelian geometry
an area of study based on the theory proposed by Alexander Grothendieck in the 1980s that describes the way a geometric object of an algebraic variety (such as an algebraic fundamental group) can be mapped into another object, without it being an abelian group.
Analysis
A wide area of mathematics centered on the study of continuous functions and including such topics as differentiation, integration, limits, and series.
Analytic combinatorics
part of enumerative combinatorics where methods of complex analysis are applied to generating functions.
Analytic geometry
1. Also known as Cartesian geometry, the study of Euclidean geometry using Cartesian coordinates.
2. Analogue to differential geometry, where differentiable functions are replaced with analytic functions. It is a subarea of both complex analysis and algebraic geometry.
Analytic number theory
An area of number theory that applies methods from mathematical analysis to solve problems about integers.
Analytic theory of L-functions
Applied mathematics
a combination of various parts of mathematics that concern a variety of mathematical methods that can be applied to practical and theoretical problems. Typically the methods used are for science, engineering, finance, economics and logistics.
Approximation theory
part of analysis that studies how well functions can be approximated by simpler ones (such as polynomials or trigonometric polynomials)
Arakelov geometry
also known as Arakelov theory
Arakelov theory
an approach to Diophantine geometry used to study Diophantine equations in higher dimensions (using techniques from algebraic geometry). It is named after Suren Arakelov.
Arithmetic
1. Also known as elementary arithmetic, the methods and rules for computing with addition, subtraction, multiplication and division of numbers.
2. Also known as higher arithmetic, another name for number theory.
Arithmetic algebraic geometry
See arithmetic geometry.
Arithmetic combinatorics
the study of the estimates from combinatorics that are associated with arithmetic operations such as addition, subtraction, multiplication and division.
Arithmetic dynamics
Arithmetic dynamics is the study of the number-theoretic properties of integer, rational, p-adic, and/or algebraic points under repeated application of a polynomial or rational function. A fundamental goal is to describe arithmetic properties in terms of underlying geometric structures.
Arithmetic geometry
The use of algebraic geometry and more specially scheme theory for solving problems of number theory.
Arithmetic topology
a combination of algebraic number theory and topology studying analogies between prime ideals and knots
Arithmetical algebraic geometry
Another name for arithmetic algebraic geometry
Asymptotic combinatorics
It uses the internal structure of the objects to derive formulas for their generating functions and then complex analysis techniques to get asymptotics.
Asymptotic theory
the study of asymptotic expansions
Auslander–Reiten theory
the study of the representation theory of Artinian rings
Axiomatic geometry
also known as synthetic geometry: it is a branch of geometry that uses axioms and logical arguments to draw conclusions as opposed to analytic and algebraic methods.
Axiomatic set theory
the study of systems of axioms in a context relevant to set theory and mathematical logic.

== B ==
Bifurcation theory
the study of changes in the qualitative or topological structure of a given family. It is a part of dynamical systems theory
Biostatistics
the development and application of statistical methods to a wide range of topics in biology.
Birational geometry
a part of algebraic geometry that deals with the geometry (of an algebraic variety) that is dependent only on its function field.
Bolyai–Lobachevskian geometry
see hyperbolic geometry

== C ==
C*-algebra theory
a complex algebra A of continuous linear operators on a complex Hilbert space with two additional properties-(i) A is a topologically closed set in the norm topology of operators.(ii)A is closed under the operation of taking adjoints of operators.
Cartesian geometry
see analytic geometry
Calculus
An area of mathematics connected by the fundamental theorem of calculus.
Calculus of infinitesimals

A foundation of calculus, first developed in the 17th century, that makes use of infinitesimal numbers.
Calculus of moving surfaces
an extension of the theory of tensor calculus to include deforming manifolds.
Calculus of variations
the field dedicated to maximizing or minimizing functionals. It used to be called functional calculus.
Catastrophe theory
a branch of bifurcation theory from dynamical systems theory, and also a special case of the more general singularity theory from geometry. It analyses the germs of the catastrophe geometries.
Categorical logic
a branch of category theory adjacent to the mathematical logic. It is based on type theory for intuitionistic logics.
Category theory
the study of the properties of particular mathematical concepts by formalising them as collections of objects and arrows.
Chaos theory
the study of the behaviour of dynamical systems that are highly sensitive to their initial conditions.
Character theory
a branch of group theory that studies the characters of group representations or modular representations.
Class field theory
a branch of algebraic number theory that studies abelian extensions of number fields.
Classical differential geometry
also known as Euclidean differential geometry. see Euclidean differential geometry.
Classical algebraic topology
see algebraic topology
Classical analysis
usually refers to the more traditional topics of analysis such as real analysis and complex analysis. It includes any work that does not use techniques from functional analysis and is sometimes called hard analysis. However it may also refer to mathematical analysis done according to the principles of classical mathematics.
Classical analytic number theory
Classical differential calculus
Classical Diophantine geometry
Classical Euclidean geometry
see Euclidean geometry
Classical geometry
may refer to solid geometry or classical Euclidean geometry. See geometry
Classical invariant theory
the form of invariant theory that deals with describing polynomial functions that are invariant under transformations from a given linear group.
Classical mathematics
the standard approach to mathematics based on classical logic and ZFC set theory.
Classical projective geometry
Classical tensor calculus
Clifford algebra
Clifford analysis
the study of Dirac operators and Dirac type operators from geometry and analysis using clifford algebras.
Clifford theory
is a branch of representation theory spawned from Cliffords theorem.
Cobordism theory
Coding theory
the study of the properties of codes and their respective fitness for specific applications.
Cohomology theory
Combinatorial analysis
Combinatorial commutative algebra
a discipline viewed as the intersection between commutative algebra and combinatorics. It frequently employs methods from one to address problems arising in the other. Polyhedral geometry also plays a significant role.
Combinatorial design theory
a part of combinatorial mathematics that deals with the existence and construction of systems of finite sets whose intersections have certain properties.
Combinatorial game theory
Combinatorial geometry
see discrete geometry
Combinatorial group theory
the theory of free groups and the presentation of a group. It is closely related to geometric group theory and is applied in geometric topology.
Combinatorial mathematics
an area primarily concerned with counting, both as a means and an end in obtaining results, and certain properties of finite structures.
Combinatorial number theory
Combinatorial optimization
Combinatorial set theory
also known as Infinitary combinatorics. see infinitary combinatorics
Combinatorial theory
Combinatorial topology
an old name for algebraic topology, when topological invariants of spaces were regarded as derived from combinatorial decompositions.
Combinatorics
a branch of discrete mathematics concerned with countable structures. Branches of it include enumerative combinatorics, combinatorial design theory, matroid theory, extremal combinatorics and algebraic combinatorics, as well as many more.
Commutative algebra
a branch of abstract algebra studying commutative rings.
Complex algebraic geometry
the mainstream of algebraic geometry devoted to the study of the complex points of algebraic varieties.
Complex analysis
a part of analysis that deals with functions of a complex variable.
Complex analytic dynamics
a subdivision of complex dynamics being the study of the dynamic systems defined by analytic functions.
Complex analytic geometry
the application of complex numbers to plane geometry.
Complex differential geometry
a branch of differential geometry that studies complex manifolds.
Complex dynamics
the study of dynamical systems defined by iterated functions on complex number spaces.
Complex geometry
the study of complex manifolds and functions of complex variables. It includes complex algebraic geometry and complex analytic geometry.
Complexity theory
the study of complex systems with the inclusion of the theory of complex systems.
Computable analysis
the study of which parts of real analysis and functional analysis can be carried out in a computable manner. It is closely related to constructive analysis.
Computable model theory
a branch of model theory dealing with the relevant questions computability.
Computability theory
a branch of mathematical logic originating in the 1930s with the study of computable functions and Turing degrees, but now includes the study of generalized computability and definability. It overlaps with proof theory and effective descriptive set theory.
Computational algebraic geometry
Computational complexity theory
a branch of mathematics and theoretical computer science that focuses on classifying computational problems according to their inherent difficulty, and relating those classes to each other.
Computational geometry
a branch of computer science devoted to the study of algorithms which can be stated in terms of geometry.
Computational group theory
the study of groups by means of computers.
Computational mathematics
the mathematical research in areas of science where computing plays an essential role.
Computational number theory
also known as algorithmic number theory, it is the study of algorithms for performing number theoretic computations.
Computational statistics
Computational synthetic geometry
Computational topology
Computer algebra
see symbolic computation
Conformal geometry
the study of conformal transformations on a space.
Constructive analysis
mathematical analysis done according to the principles of constructive mathematics. This differs from classical analysis.
Constructive function theory
a branch of analysis that is closely related to approximation theory, studying the connection between the smoothness of a function and its degree of approximation
Constructive mathematics
mathematics which tends to use intuitionistic logic. Essentially that is classical logic but without the assumption that the law of the excluded middle is an axiom.
Constructive quantum field theory
a branch of mathematical physics that is devoted to showing that quantum theory is mathematically compatible with special relativity.
Constructive set theory
an approach to mathematical constructivism following the program of axiomatic set theory, using the usual first-order language of classical set theory.
Contact geometry
a branch of differential geometry and topology, closely related to and considered the odd-dimensional counterpart of symplectic geometry. It is the study of a geometric structure called a contact structure on a differentiable manifold.
Convex analysis
the study of properties of convex functions and convex sets.
Convex geometry
part of geometry devoted to the study of convex sets.
Coordinate geometry
see analytic geometry
CR geometry
a branch of differential geometry, being the study of CR manifolds.
Cryptography

== D ==
Decision analysis
Decision theory
Derived noncommutative algebraic geometry
Descriptive set theory
a part of mathematical logic, more specifically a part of set theory dedicated to the study of Polish spaces.
Differential algebraic geometry
the adaption of methods and concepts from algebraic geometry to systems of algebraic differential equations.
Differential calculus
The branch of calculus contrasted to integral calculus, and concerned with derivatives.
Differential Galois theory
the study of the Galois groups of differential fields.
Differential geometry
a form of geometry that uses techniques from integral and differential calculus as well as linear and multilinear algebra to study problems in geometry. Classically, these were problems of Euclidean geometry, although now it has been expanded. It is generally concerned with geometric structures on differentiable manifolds. It is closely related to differential topology.
Differential geometry of curves
the study of smooth curves in Euclidean space by using techniques from differential geometry
Differential geometry of surfaces
the study of smooth surfaces with various additional structures using the techniques of differential geometry.
Differential topology
a branch of topology that deals with differentiable functions on differentiable manifolds.
Diffiety theory
Diophantine geometry
in general the study of algebraic varieties over fields that are finitely generated over their prime fields.
Discrepancy theory
Discrete differential geometry
Discrete exterior calculus
Discrete geometry
a branch of geometry that studies combinatorial properties and constructive methods of discrete geometric objects.
Discrete mathematics
the study of mathematical structures that are fundamentally discrete rather than continuous.
Discrete Morse theory
a combinatorial adaption of Morse theory.
Distance geometry
Domain theory
a branch that studies special kinds of partially ordered sets (posets) commonly called domains.
Donaldson theory
the study of smooth 4-manifolds using gauge theory.
Dyadic algebra
Dynamical systems theory
an area used to describe the behavior of the complex dynamical systems, usually by employing differential equations or difference equations.

== E ==
Econometrics
the application of mathematical and statistical methods to economic data.
Effective descriptive set theory
a branch of descriptive set theory dealing with set of real numbers that have lightface definitions. It uses aspects of computability theory.
Elementary algebra
a fundamental form of algebra extending on elementary arithmetic to include the concept of variables.
Elementary arithmetic
the simplified portion of arithmetic considered necessary for primary education. It includes the usage addition, subtraction, multiplication and division of the natural numbers. It also includes the concept of fractions and negative numbers.
Elementary mathematics
parts of mathematics frequently taught at the primary and secondary school levels. This includes elementary arithmetic, geometry, probability and statistics, elementary algebra and trigonometry. (calculus is not usually considered a part)
Elementary group theory
the study of the basics of group theory
Elimination theory
the classical name for algorithmic approaches to eliminating between polynomials of several variables. It is a part of commutative algebra and algebraic geometry.
Elliptic geometry
a type of non-Euclidean geometry (it violates Euclid's parallel postulate) and is based on spherical geometry. It is constructed in elliptic space.
Enumerative combinatorics
an area of combinatorics that deals with the number of ways that certain patterns can be formed.
Enumerative geometry
a branch of algebraic geometry concerned with counting the number of solutions to geometric questions. This is usually done by means of intersection theory.
Epidemiology
Equivariant noncommutative algebraic geometry
Ergodic Ramsey theory
a branch where problems are motivated by additive combinatorics and solved using ergodic theory.
Ergodic theory
the study of dynamical systems with an invariant measure, and related problems.
Euclidean geometry
An area of geometry based on the axiom system and synthetic methods of the ancient Greek mathematician Euclid.
Euclidean differential geometry
also known as classical differential geometry. See differential geometry.
Euler calculus
a methodology from applied algebraic topology and integral geometry that integrates constructible functions and more recently definable functions by integrating with respect to the Euler characteristic as a finitely-additive measure.
Experimental mathematics
an approach to mathematics in which computation is used to investigate mathematical objects and identify properties and patterns.
Exterior algebra
Exterior calculus
Extraordinary cohomology theory
Extremal combinatorics
a branch of combinatorics, it is the study of the possible sizes of a collection of finite objects given certain restrictions.
Extremal graph theory
a branch of mathematics that studies how global properties of a graph influence local substructure.

== F ==
Field theory
The branch of algebra dedicated to fields, a type of algebraic structure.
Finite geometry
Finite model theory
a restriction of model theory to interpretations on finite structures, which have a finite universe.
Finsler geometry
a branch of differential geometry whose main object of study is Finsler manifolds, a generalisation of a Riemannian manifolds.
First order arithmetic
Fourier analysis
the study of the way general functions may be represented or approximated by sums of trigonometric functions.
Fractal geometry
Fractional calculus
a branch of analysis that studies the possibility of taking real or complex powers of the differentiation operator.
Fractional dynamics
investigates the behaviour of objects and systems that are described by differentiation and integration of fractional orders using methods of fractional calculus.
Fredholm theory
part of spectral theory studying integral equations.
Function theory
an ambiguous term that generally refers to mathematical analysis.
Functional analysis
a branch of mathematical analysis, the core of which is formed by the study of function spaces, which are some sort of topological vector spaces.
Functional calculus
historically the term was used synonymously with calculus of variations, but now refers to a branch of functional analysis connected with spectral theory
Fuzzy mathematics
a branch of mathematics based on fuzzy set theory and fuzzy logic.
Fuzzy measure theory
Fuzzy set theory
a form of set theory that studies fuzzy sets, that is sets that have degrees of membership.

== G ==
Galois cohomology
an application of homological algebra, it is the study of group cohomology of Galois modules.
Galois theory
named after Évariste Galois, it is a branch of abstract algebra providing a connection between field theory and group theory.
Galois geometry
a branch of finite geometry concerned with algebraic and analytic geometry over a Galois field.
Game theory
the study of mathematical models of strategic interaction among rational decision-makers.
Gauge theory
General topology
also known as point-set topology, it is a branch of topology studying the properties of topological spaces and structures defined on them. It differs from other branches of topology as the topological spaces do not have to be similar to manifolds.
Generalized trigonometry
developments of trigonometric methods from the application to real numbers of Euclidean geometry to any geometry or space. This includes spherical trigonometry, hyperbolic trigonometry, gyrotrigonometry, and universal hyperbolic trigonometry.
Geometric algebra
an alternative approach to classical, computational and relativistic geometry. It shows a natural correspondence between geometric entities and elements of algebra.
Geometric analysis
a discipline that uses methods from differential geometry to study partial differential equations as well as the applications to geometry.
Geometric calculus
extends the geometric algebra to include differentiation and integration.
Geometric combinatorics
a branch of combinatorics. It includes a number of subareas such as polyhedral combinatorics (the study of faces of convex polyhedra), convex geometry (the study of convex sets, in particular combinatorics of their intersections), and discrete geometry, which in turn has many applications to computational geometry.
Geometric function theory
the study of geometric properties of analytic functions.
Geometric invariant theory
a method for constructing quotients by group actions in algebraic geometry, used to construct moduli spaces.
Geometric graph theory
a large and amorphous subfield of graph theory, concerned with graphs defined by geometric means.
Geometric group theory
the study of finitely generated groups via exploring the connections between algebraic properties of such groups and topological and geometric properties of spaces on which these groups act (that is, when the groups in question are realized as geometric symmetries or continuous transformations of some spaces).
Geometric measure theory
the study of geometric properties of sets (typically in Euclidean space) through measure theory.
Geometric number theory
Geometric topology
a branch of topology studying manifolds and mappings between them; in particular the embedding of one manifold into another.
Geometry
a branch of mathematics concerned with shape and the properties of space. Classically it arose as what is now known as solid geometry; this was concerning practical knowledge of length, area and volume. It was then put into an axiomatic form by Euclid, giving rise to what is now known as classical Euclidean geometry. The use of coordinates by René Descartes gave rise to Cartesian geometry enabling a more analytical approach to geometric entities. Since then many other branches have appeared including projective geometry, differential geometry, non-Euclidean geometry, Fractal geometry and algebraic geometry. Geometry also gave rise to the modern discipline of topology.
Geometry of numbers
initiated by Hermann Minkowski, it is a branch of number theory studying convex bodies and integer vectors.
Global analysis
the study of differential equations on manifolds and the relationship between differential equations and topology.
Global arithmetic dynamics
Graph theory
a branch of discrete mathematics devoted to the study of graphs. It has many applications in physical, biological and social systems.
Group-character theory
the part of character theory dedicated to the study of characters of group representations.
Group representation theory
Group theory
the study of algebraic structures known as groups.
Gyrotrigonometry
a form of trigonometry used in gyrovector space for hyperbolic geometry. (An analogy of the vector space in Euclidean geometry.)

== H ==
Hard analysis
see classical analysis
Harmonic analysis
part of analysis concerned with the representations of functions in terms of waves. It generalizes the notions of Fourier series and Fourier transforms from the Fourier analysis.
Higher arithmetic
Higher category theory
the part of category theory at a higher order, which means that some equalities are replaced by explicit arrows in order to be able to explicitly study the structure behind those equalities.
Higher-dimensional algebra
the study of categorified structures.
Hodge theory
a method for studying the cohomology groups of a smooth manifold M using partial differential equations.
Hodge–Arakelov theory
Holomorphic functional calculus
a branch of functional calculus starting with holomorphic functions.
Homological algebra
the study of homology in general algebraic settings.
Homology theory
Homotopy theory
Hyperbolic geometry
also known as Lobachevskian geometry or Bolyai-Lobachevskian geometry. It is a non-Euclidean geometry looking at hyperbolic space.
hyperbolic trigonometry
the study of hyperbolic triangles in hyperbolic geometry, or hyperbolic functions in Euclidean geometry. Other forms include gyrotrigonometry and universal hyperbolic trigonometry.
Hypercomplex analysis
the extension of real analysis and complex analysis to the study of functions where the argument is a hypercomplex number.
Hyperfunction theory

== I ==
Ideal theory
once the precursor name for what is now known as commutative algebra; it is the theory of ideals in commutative rings.
Idempotent analysis
the study of idempotent semirings, such as the tropical semiring.
Incidence geometry
the study of relations of incidence between various geometric objects, like curves and lines.
Inconsistent mathematics
see paraconsistent mathematics.
Infinitary combinatorics
an expansion of ideas in combinatorics to account for infinite sets.
Infinitesimal analysis
once a synonym for infinitesimal calculus
Infinitesimal calculus
See calculus of infinitesimals
Information geometry
an interdisciplinary field that applies the techniques of differential geometry to study probability theory and statistics. It studies statistical manifolds, which are Riemannian manifolds whose points correspond to probability distributions.
Integral calculus
The branch of calculus concerned with integrals, contrasted to differential calculus.
Integral geometry
the theory of measures on a geometrical space invariant under the symmetry group of that space.
Intersection theory
a branch of algebraic geometry and algebraic topology
Intuitionistic type theory
a type theory and an alternative foundation of mathematics.
Invariant theory
studies how group actions on algebraic varieties affect functions.
Inventory theory
Inversive geometry
the study of invariants preserved by a type of transformation known as inversion
Inversive plane geometry
inversive geometry that is limited to two dimensions
Inversive ring geometry
Itô calculus
extends the methods of calculus to stochastic processes such as Brownian motion (see Wiener process). It has important applications in mathematical finance and stochastic differential equations.
Iwasawa theory
the study of objects of arithmetic interest over infinite towers of number fields.
Iwasawa-Tate theory

== J ==
Job shop scheduling

== K ==
K-theory
originated as the study of a ring generated by vector bundles over a topological space or scheme. In algebraic topology it is an extraordinary cohomology theory known as topological K-theory. In algebra and algebraic geometry it is referred to as algebraic K-theory. In physics, K-theory has appeared in type II string theory. (In particular twisted K-theory.)
K-homology
a homology theory on the category of locally compact Hausdorff spaces.
Kähler geometry
a branch of differential geometry, more specifically a union of Riemannian geometry, complex differential geometry and symplectic geometry. It is the study of Kähler manifolds. (named after Erich Kähler)
KK-theory
a common generalization both of K-homology and K-theory as an additive bivariant functor on separable C*-algebras.
Klein geometry
More specifically, it is a homogeneous space X together with a transitive action on X by a Lie group G, which acts as the symmetry group of the geometry.
Knot theory
part of topology dealing with knots
Kummer theory
provides a description of certain types of field extensions involving the adjunction of nth roots of elements of the base field

== L ==
L-theory
the K-theory of quadratic forms.
Large deviations theory
part of probability theory studying events of small probability (tail events).
Large sample theory
also known as asymptotic theory
Lattice theory
the study of lattices, being important in order theory and universal algebra
Lie algebra theory
Lie group theory
Lie sphere geometry
geometrical theory of planar or spatial geometry in which the fundamental concept is the circle or sphere.
Lie theory
Line geometry
Linear algebra
a branch of algebra studying linear spaces and linear maps. It has applications in fields such as abstract algebra and functional analysis; it can be represented in analytic geometry and it is generalized in operator theory and in module theory. Sometimes matrix theory is considered a branch, although linear algebra is restricted to only finite dimensions. Extensions of the methods used belong to multilinear algebra.
Linear functional analysis
Linear programming
a method to achieve the best outcome (such as maximum profit or lowest cost) in a mathematical model whose requirements are represented by linear relationships.
List of graphical methods
Included are diagram techniques, chart techniques, plot techniques, and other forms of visualization.
Local algebra
a term sometimes applied to the theory of local rings.
Local class field theory
the study of abelian extensions of local fields.
Low-dimensional topology
the branch of topology that studies manifolds, or more generally topological spaces, of four or fewer dimensions.

== M ==
Malliavin calculus
a set of mathematical techniques and ideas that extend the mathematical field of calculus of variations from deterministic functions to stochastic processes.
Mathematical biology
the mathematical modeling of biological phenomena.
Mathematical chemistry
the mathematical modeling of chemical phenomena.
Mathematical economics
the application of mathematical methods to represent theories and analyze problems in economics.
Mathematical finance
a field of applied mathematics, concerned with mathematical modeling of financial markets.
Mathematical logic
a subfield of mathematics exploring the applications of formal logic to mathematics.
Mathematical optimization
Mathematical physics
The development of mathematical methods suitable for application to problems in physics.
Mathematical psychology
an approach to psychological research that is based on mathematical modeling of perceptual, thought, cognitive and motor processes, and on the establishment of law-like rules that relate quantifiable stimulus characteristics with quantifiable behavior.
Mathematical sciences
refers to academic disciplines that are mathematical in nature, but are not considered proper subfields of mathematics. Examples include statistics, cryptography, game theory and actuarial science.
Mathematical sociology
the area of sociology that uses mathematics to construct social theories.
Mathematical statistics
the application of probability theory, a branch of mathematics, to statistics, as opposed to techniques for collecting statistical data.
Mathematical system theory
Matrix algebra
Matrix calculus
Matrix theory
Matroid theory
Measure theory
Metric geometry
Microlocal analysis
Model theory
the study of classes of mathematical structures (e.g. groups, fields, graphs, universes of set theory) from the perspective of mathematical logic.
Modern algebra
Occasionally used for abstract algebra. The term was coined by van der Waerden as the title of his book Moderne Algebra, which was renamed Algebra in the latest editions.
Modern algebraic geometry
the form of algebraic geometry given by Alexander Grothendieck and Jean-Pierre Serre drawing on sheaf theory.
Modern invariant theory
the form of invariant theory that analyses the decomposition of representations into irreducibles.
Modular representation theory
a part of representation theory that studies linear representations of finite groups over a field K of positive characteristic p, necessarily a prime number.
Module theory
Molecular geometry
Morse theory
a part of differential topology, it analyzes the topological space of a manifold by studying differentiable functions on that manifold.
Motivic cohomology
Multilinear algebra
an extension of linear algebra building upon concepts of p-vectors and multivectors with Grassmann algebra.
Multiplicative number theory
a subfield of analytic number theory that deals with prime numbers, factorization and divisors.
Multivariable calculus
the extension of calculus in one variable to calculus with functions of several variables: the differentiation and integration of functions involving several variables, rather than just one.
Multiple-scale analysis

== N ==
Neutral geometry
See absolute geometry.
Nevanlinna theory
part of complex analysis studying the value distribution of meromorphic functions. It is named after Rolf Nevanlinna
Nielsen theory
an area of mathematical research with its origins in fixed point topology, developed by Jakob Nielsen
Non-abelian class field theory
Non-classical analysis
Non-Euclidean geometry
Non-standard analysis
Non-standard calculus
Nonarchimedean dynamics
also known as p-adic analysis or local arithmetic dynamics
Noncommutative algebra
Noncommutative algebraic geometry
a direction in noncommutative geometry studying the geometric properties of formal duals of non-commutative algebraic objects.
Noncommutative geometry
Noncommutative harmonic analysis
see representation theory
Noncommutative topology
Nonlinear analysis
Nonlinear functional analysis
Number theory
a branch of pure mathematics primarily devoted to the study of the integers. Originally it was known as arithmetic or higher arithmetic.
Numerical analysis
Numerical linear algebra

== O ==
Operad theory
a type of abstract algebra concerned with prototypical algebras.
Operation research
Operator K-theory
Operator theory
part of functional analysis studying operators.
Optimal control theory
a generalization of the calculus of variations.
Optimal maintenance
Orbifold theory
Order theory
a branch that investigates the intuitive notion of order using binary relations.
Ordered geometry
a form of geometry omitting the notion of measurement but featuring the concept of intermediacy. It is a fundamental geometry forming a common framework for affine geometry, Euclidean geometry, absolute geometry and hyperbolic geometry.
Oscillation theory

== P ==
p-adic analysis
a branch of number theory that deals with the analysis of functions of p-adic numbers.
p-adic dynamics
an application of p-adic analysis looking at p-adic differential equations.
p-adic Hodge theory
Parabolic geometry
Paraconsistent mathematics
sometimes called inconsistent mathematics, it is an attempt to develop the classical infrastructure of mathematics based on a foundation of paraconsistent logic instead of classical logic.
Partition theory
Perturbation theory
Picard–Vessiot theory
Plane geometry
Point-set topology
see general topology
Pointless topology
Poisson geometry
Polyhedral combinatorics
a branch within combinatorics and discrete geometry that studies the problems of describing convex polytopes.
Possibility theory
Potential theory
Precalculus
Predicative mathematics
Probability theory
Probabilistic combinatorics
Probabilistic graph theory
Probabilistic number theory
Projective geometry
a form of geometry that studies geometric properties that are invariant under a projective transformation.
Projective differential geometry
Proof theory
Pseudo-Riemannian geometry
generalizes Riemannian geometry to the study of pseudo-Riemannian manifolds.
Pure mathematics
the part of mathematics that studies entirely abstract concepts.

== Q ==
Quantum calculus
a form of calculus without the notion of limits.
Quantum geometry
the generalization of concepts of geometry used to describe the physical phenomena of quantum physics
Quaternionic analysis

== R ==
Ramsey theory
the study of the conditions in which order must appear. It is named after Frank P. Ramsey.
Rational geometry
Real algebra
the study of the part of algebra relevant to real algebraic geometry.
Real algebraic geometry
the part of algebraic geometry that studies real points of the algebraic varieties.
Real analysis
a branch of mathematical analysis; in particular hard analysis, that is the study of real numbers and functions of Real values. It provides a rigorous formulation of the calculus of real numbers in terms of continuity and smoothness, whilst the theory is extended to the complex numbers in complex analysis.
Real Clifford algebra
Real K-theory
Recreational mathematics
the area dedicated to mathematical puzzles and mathematical games.
Recursion theory
see computability theory
Representation theory
a subfield of abstract algebra; it studies algebraic structures by representing their elements as linear transformations of vector spaces. It also studies modules over these algebraic structures, providing a way of reducing problems in abstract algebra to problems in linear algebra.
Representation theory of groups
Representation theory of the Galilean group
Representation theory of the Lorentz group
Representation theory of the Poincaré group
Representation theory of the symmetric group
Ribbon theory
a branch of topology studying ribbons.
Ricci calculus

A foundation of tensor calculus, developed by Gregorio Ricci-Curbastro in 1887–1896, and later developed for its applications to general relativity and differential geometry.
Ring theory
Riemannian geometry
a branch of differential geometry that is more specifically, the study of Riemannian manifolds. It is named after Bernhard Riemann and it features many generalizations of concepts from Euclidean geometry, analysis and calculus.
Rough set theory
the a form of set theory based on rough sets.

== S ==
Sampling theory
Scheme theory
the study of schemes introduced by Alexander Grothendieck. It allows the use of sheaf theory to study algebraic varieties and is considered the central part of modern algebraic geometry.
Secondary calculus
Semialgebraic geometry
a part of algebraic geometry; more specifically a branch of real algebraic geometry that studies semialgebraic sets.
Set-theoretic topology
Set theory
Sheaf theory
The study of sheaves, which connect local and global properties of geometric objects.
Sheaf cohomology
Sieve theory
Single operator theory
deals with the properties and classifications of single operators.
Singularity theory
a branch, notably of geometry; that studies the failure of manifold structure.
Smooth infinitesimal analysis
a rigorous reformation of infinitesimal calculus employing methods of category theory. As a theory, it is a subset of synthetic differential geometry.
Solid geometry
Spatial geometry
Spectral geometry
a field that concerns the relationships between geometric structures of manifolds and spectra of canonically defined differential operators.
Spectral graph theory
the study of properties of a graph using methods from matrix theory.
Spectral theory
part of operator theory extending the concepts of eigenvalues and eigenvectors from linear algebra and matrix theory.
Spectral theory of ordinary differential equations
part of spectral theory concerned with the spectrum and eigenfunction expansion associated with linear ordinary differential equations.
Spectrum continuation analysis
generalizes the concept of a Fourier series to non-periodic functions.
Spherical geometry
a branch of non-Euclidean geometry, studying the 2-dimensional surface of a sphere.
Spherical trigonometry
a branch of spherical geometry that studies polygons on the surface of a sphere. Usually the polygons are triangles.
Statistical mechanics
Statistical modelling
Statistical theory
Statistics
although the term may refer to the more general study of statistics, the term is used in mathematics to refer to the mathematical study of statistics and related fields. This includes probability theory.
Steganography
Stochastic calculus
Stochastic calculus of variations
Stochastic geometry
the study of random patterns of points
Stochastic process
Stratified Morse theory
Super linear algebra
Surgery theory
a part of geometric topology referring to methods used to produce one manifold from another (in a controlled way.)
Survey sampling
Survey methodology
Symbolic computation
also known as algebraic computation and computer algebra. It refers to the techniques used to manipulate mathematical expressions and equations in symbolic form as opposed to manipulating them by the numerical quantities represented by them.
Symbolic dynamics
Symplectic geometry
a branch of differential geometry and topology whose main object of study is the symplectic manifold.
Symplectic topology
Synthetic differential geometry
a reformulation of differential geometry in the language of topos theory and in the context of an intuitionistic logic.
Synthetic geometry
also known as axiomatic geometry, it is a branch of geometry that uses axioms and logical arguments to draw conclusions as opposed to analytic and algebraic methods.
Systolic geometry
a branch of differential geometry studying systolic invariants of manifolds and polyhedra.
Systolic hyperbolic geometry
the study of systoles in hyperbolic geometry.

== T ==
Tensor algebra, Tensor analysis, Tensor calculus, Tensor theory
the study and use of tensors, which are generalizations of vectors. A tensor algebra is also an algebraic structure that is used in the formal definition of tensors.
Tessellation
when periodic tiling has a repeating pattern.
Theoretical physics
a branch primarily of the science physics that uses mathematical models and abstraction of physics to rationalize and predict phenomena.
Theory of computation
Time-scale calculus
Topology
Topological combinatorics
the application of methods from algebraic topology to solve problems in combinatorics.
Topological degree theory
Topological graph theory
Topological K-theory
Topos theory
Toric geometry
Transcendental number theory
a branch of number theory that revolves around the transcendental numbers.
Transformation geometry
Trigonometry
the study of triangles and the relationships between the length of their sides, and the angles between them. It is essential to many parts of applied mathematics.
Tropical analysis
see idempotent analysis
Tropical geometry
Twisted K-theory
a variation on K-theory, spanning abstract algebra, algebraic topology and operator theory.
Type theory

== U ==
Umbral calculus
the study of Sheffer sequences
Uncertainty theory
a new branch of mathematics based on normality, monotonicity, self-duality, countable subadditivity, and product measure axioms.
Universal algebra
a field studying the formalization of algebraic structures itself.
Universal hyperbolic trigonometry
an approach to hyperbolic trigonometry based on rational geometry.

== V ==
Valuation theory
Variational analysis
Vector algebra
a part of linear algebra concerned with the operations of vector addition and scalar multiplication, although it may also refer to vector operations of vector calculus, including the dot and cross product. In this case it can be contrasted with geometric algebra which generalizes into higher dimensions.
Vector analysis
also known as vector calculus, see vector calculus.
Vector calculus
a branch of multivariable calculus concerned with differentiation and integration of vector fields. Primarily it is concerned with 3-dimensional Euclidean space.

== W ==
Wavelets

== See also ==
- Lists of mathematics topics
- Outline of mathematics
- Category:Glossaries of mathematics
