= Alexandre Mikhailovich Vinogradov =

Russian-Italian mathematician (1938–2019)

- Александр Михайлович Виноградов
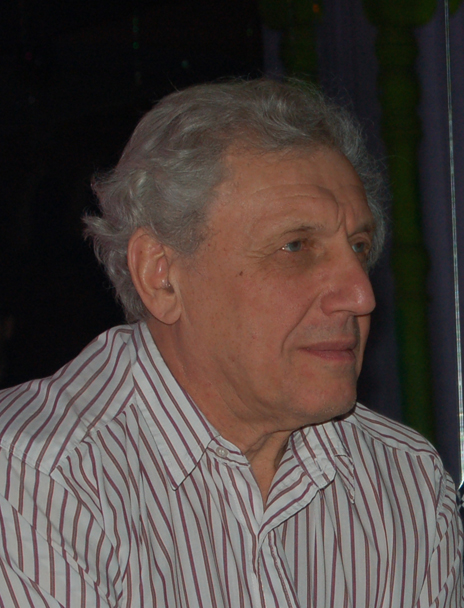
- Born: 18 February 1938; Novorossiysk, Soviet Union
- Died: 20 September 2019 (aged 81); Lizzano in Belvedere, Italy
- Education: Moscow State University
- Known for: Diffiety, Vinogradov sequence, Secondary calculus
- Scientific career
- Fields: Mathematics
- Workplaces: Moscow State University; University of Salerno
- Doctoral advisor: Vladimir Boltyansky and Boris Delaunay
- Website: https://diffiety.mccme.ru/curvita/amv.htm https://gdeq.org/Alexandre_Vinogradov

Alexandre Mikhailovich Vinogradov (Russian: Александр Михайлович Виноградов; 18 February 1938 – 20 September 2019) was a Russian and Italian mathematician. He made important contributions to the areas of differential calculus over commutative algebras, the algebraic theory of differential operators, homological algebra, differential geometry and algebraic topology, mechanics and mathematical physics, the geometrical theory of nonlinear partial differential equations and secondary calculus.

== Biography ==
A.M. Vinogradov was born on 18 February 1938 in Novorossiysk. His father, Mikhail Ivanovich Vinogradov, was a hydraulics scientist; his mother, Ilza Alexandrovna Firer, was a medical doctor. Among his more distant ancestors, his great-grandfather, Anton Smagin, was a self-taught peasant and a deputy of the State Duma of the second convocation.

Between 1955 and 1960 Vinogradov studied at the Mechanics and Mathematics Department of Moscow State University (Mech-mat). He pursued a PhD at the same institution, defending his thesis in 1964, under the supervision of V.G. Boltyansky.

After teaching for one year at the Moscow Mining Institute, in 1965 he received a position at the Department of Higher Geometry and Topology of Moscow State University. He obtained his habilitation degree (doktorskaya dissertatsiya) in 1984 at the Institute of Mathematics of the Siberian Branch of the USSR Academy of Science in Novosibirsk in Russia. In 1990 he left the Soviet Union for Italy, and from 1993 to 2010 was professor in geometry at the University of Salerno.

== Research ==
Vinogradov published his first works in number theory, together with B.N. Delaunay and D.B. Fuchs, when he was a second year undergraduate student. By the end of his undergraduate years he changed research interests and started working on algebraic topology. His PhD thesis was devoted to homotopic properties of the embedding spaces of circles into the 2-sphere or the 3-disk. He continued working in algebraic and differential topology – in particular, on the Adams spectral sequence – until the early seventies.

Between the sixties and the seventies, inspired by the ideas of Sophus Lie, Vinogradov changed once more research interests and began to investigate the foundations of the geometric theory of partial differential equations. Having become familiar with the work of Spencer, Goldschmidt and Quillen on formal integrability, he turned his attention to the algebraic (in particular, cohomological) component of that theory. In 1972, he published a short note containing what he called the main functors of the differential calculus over commutative algebras.

Vinogradov’s approach to nonlinear differential equations as geometric objects, with their general theory and applications, is developed in details in some monographs as well as in some articles. He recast infinitely prolonged differential equations into a category whose objects, called diffieties, are studied in the framework of what he called secondary calculus (by analogy with secondary quantization). One of the central parts of this theory is based on the $\cal C$-spectral sequence (now known as the Vinogradov spectral sequence). The first term of this spectral sequence gives a unified cohomological approach to various notions and statements, including the Lagrangian formalism with constraints, conservation laws, cosymmetries, the Noether theorem, and the Helmholtz criterion in the inverse problem of the calculus of variations (for arbitrary nonlinear differential operators). A particular case of the $\cal C$-spectral sequence (for an “empty” equation, i.e., for the space of infinite jets) is the so-called variational bicomplex.

Furthermore, Vinogradov introduced a new bracket on the graded algebra of linear transformations of a cochain complex. The Vinogradov bracket is skew-symmetric and satisfies the Jacobi identity modulo a coboundary. Vinogradov’s construction is a precursor of the general concept of a derived bracket on a differential Leibniz algebra introduced by Kosmann-Schwarzbach in 1996. These results were also applied to Poisson geometry.

Together with Peter Michor, Vinogradov was concerned with the analysis and comparison of various generalizations of Lie (super) algebras, including $L_\infty$ algebras and Filippov algebras. He also developed a theory of compatibility of Lie algebra structures and proved that any finite-dimensional Lie algebra over an algebraically closed field or over $\mathbb{R}$ can be assembled in a few steps from two elementary constituents, that he called dyons and triadons. Furthermore, he speculated that this particle-like structures could be related to the ultimate structure of elementary particles.

Vinogradov's research interests were also motivated by problems of contemporary physics – for example the structure of Hamiltonian mechanics, the dynamics of acoustic beams, the equations of magnetohydrodynamics (the so-called Kadomtsev-Pogutse equations appearing in the stability theory of high-temperature plasma in tokamaks) and mathematical questions in general relativity. Considerable attention to the mathematical understanding of the fundamental physical notion of observable is given in a book written by Vinogradov jointly with several participants of his seminar, under the pen name of Jet Nestruev.

== Contribution to the mathematical community ==
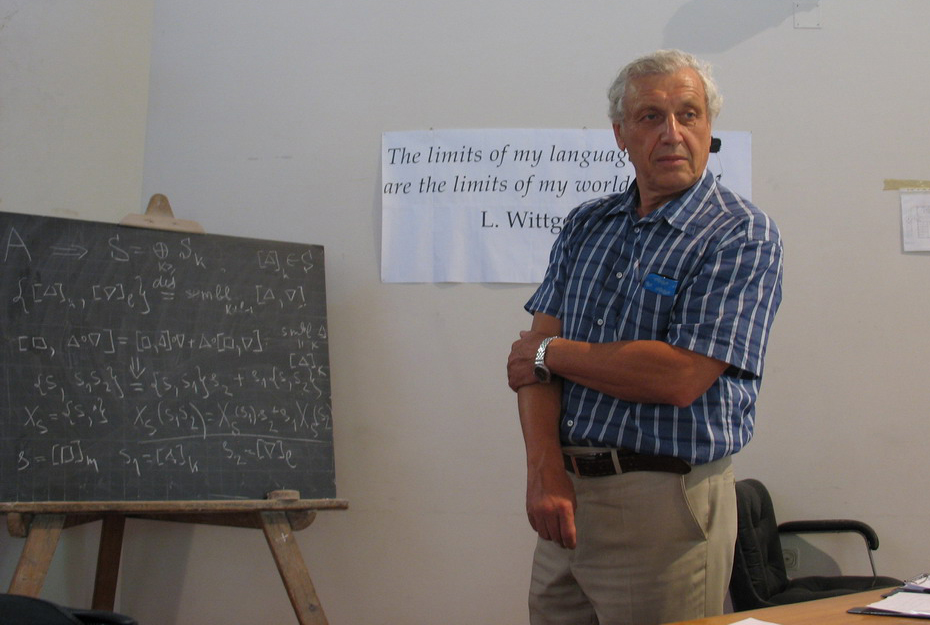
Prof. A. M. Vinogradov during a lecture

From 1967 until 1990, Vinogradov headed a research seminar at Mekhmat, which became a prominent feature in the mathematical life of Moscow. In 1978, he was one of the organisers and first lecturers in the so-called People's University for students who were not accepted to Mekhmat because they were ethnically Jewish (he ironically called this school the “People’s Friendship University”). In 1985, he created a laboratory that studied various aspects of the geometry of differential equations at the Institute of Programming Systems in Pereslavl-Zalessky and was its scientific supervisor until his departure for Italy.

Vinogradov was one of the initial founder of the mathematical journal Differential Geometry and its Applications, remaining one of the editors from 1991 to his last days. A special issue of the journal, devoted to the geometry of PDEs, was published in his memory.

In 1993 he was one of the promoters of the Schrödinger International Institute in Mathematical Physics in Vienna. In 1997 he organised the large conference Secondary Calculus and Cohomological Physics in Moscow, which was followed by a series of small conferences called Current Geometry that took place in Italy from 2000 to 2010.

From 1998 to 2019, Vinogradov organised and directed the so-called Diffiety Schools in Italy, Russia, and Poland, in which a wide range of courses were taught, in order to prepare students and young researchers to work on the theory of diffieties and secondary calculus. In 1995, he established the Institute of Diffeotopy, an informal research community centered on his students and seminar participants. The Institute published a series of preprints and was actively involved in organizing the Diffeotopy Schools and the 1997 Moscow Conference.

He supervised 19 PhD students.
