= Prime ideal theorem =

In mathematics, the prime ideal theorem may be

- the Boolean prime ideal theorem
- the Landau prime ideal theorem on number fields
