= Algebraic differential geometry =

Algebraic differential geometry may refer to:

- Differential algebraic geometry
- Differential geometry of algebraic manifolds
- Manifolds equipped with a derivation
