= Rakesh Sarin =

Indian-American academic

Rakesh Kumar Sarin
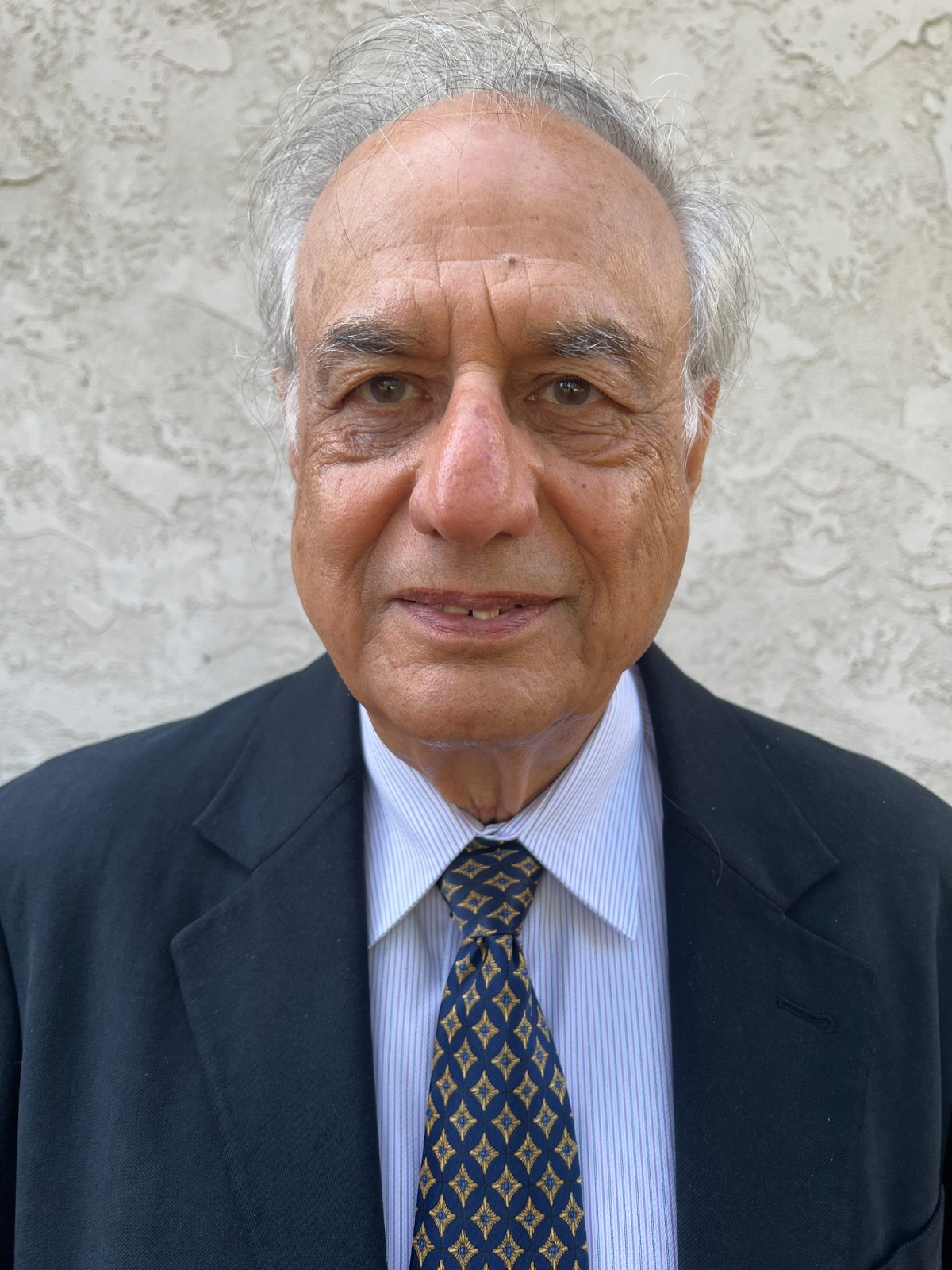
- Occupations: Decision analyst, author, and academic

Academic background
- Education: BE in Mechanical Engineering; MBA in Management; MS in Management; PhD in Management
- Alma mater: M.R. Engineering College; Indian Institute of Management; University of California, Los Angeles (UCLA)

Academic work
- Institutions: University of California, Los Angeles (UCLA)

Rakesh Kumar Sarin is a decision analyst, author, and academic. He is a Distinguished Professor and holds the Paine Chair in Management at the University of California, Los Angeles (UCLA).

Sarin’s research has investigated theories concerning laws of happiness and decision-making. He is an elected fellow of the Institute for Operations Research and the Management Sciences.

== Education and early career ==
Sarin completed his BE in Mechanical Engineering at M.R. Engineering College in 1969 and his MBA in Management from the Indian Institute of Management in 1971. He earned his MS and PhD in Management from the University of California in 1973 and 1975, respectively.

== Career ==
Sarin began his career as an assistant professor at the Indian Institute of Management from 1975 to 1976. Subsequently, he assumed the position of decision analyst at Woodward Clyde Consultants, a role he held until 1977. At Purdue University, he worked as an assistant professor between 1977 and 1979, and at Duke University, he held the position of IBM research professor from 1987 to 1990. He joined the University of California, Los Angeles (UCLA) as an assistant professor in 1979, was appointed associate professor in 1981, and became a professor in 1985. Since 1990, he has also been the Paine Chair in Management at UCLA. He was the editor-in-chief of Decision Analysis from 2013 to 2018.

== Research ==
During his early years of research work, Sarin established that fairness judgments were greatly influenced by equity in the distribution of risks and benefits, with people preferring balanced trade-offs between compensatory benefits and mortality risks. Some of his early work was on prescriptive models of decisions with multiple objectives. Together with Dyer, he developed a measurable multi-attribute value function theory and presented conditions for multiplicative and additive forms for it. Along with Wakker, he documented that dynamic choice could support unexpected utility models, with sequential consistency guaranteeing coherence, particularly for multiple priors, while rank-dependent and betweenness models continued to be more limited in application. Together, they also stipulated a structure for modeling uncertainty beyond conventional expected utility assumptions by incorporating cumulative dominance, strengthening the basis of probabilistic sophistication. Additionally, while undermining the validity of Fox and Tversky's arguments in non-comparative settings, he demonstrated the persistence of ambiguity aversion and showed that comparative ignorance widened valuation gaps.

With Abramson and others, he showed that competitive decision making was greatly influenced by information access, particularly decision aids, which increased price competition and reduced profits. He also determined that when payments were made available without cognitive load, normatively sound choices predominated; however, retrospective evaluations of payment sequences exhibited duration neglect and peak-end effects, mostly under distraction. By incorporating satiation into discounted utility, he underscored that recent consumption reduced current utility, deviating from standard DU predictions, particularly for short intervals, however agreeing with them for long intervals.

In a collaborative study, he concluded that in situations of uncertainty, dyads remained cautious, continually displaying risk-averse shifts and strengthening resistance to ambiguity in group decision-making, rather than having two heads reducing ambiguity resistance. He also observed how variety-seeking and habitual utilization influenced the decision-making process and explained biases like projection bias in consumption behaviors by showing that satiation and habit formation impacted utility predictions.

== Works ==
Sarin authored a book titled Engineering Happiness: A New Approach for Building a Joyful Life, where he examined happiness by employing behavioral sciences. Stefan Trautmann, in his review of the book, commended the author's efforts in succeeding "to show the reader the potential effects of social comparisons, losses, adaptation etc. on our life satisfaction"; however, he also criticized the book for being complicated despite it being "advertised for people 'regardless of background, profession or aspirations'". The book also won the Decision Analysis publication award in 2014. His other book Perspectives in Operations Management: Essays in Honor of Elwood S. Buffa compiled essays on the field of operations management.

== Awards and honors ==
- 2000 – Neidorf "Decade" Teaching Award, UCLA Anderson School of Management
- 2006 – J. Clayburn Laforce Faculty Leadership Award, UCLA Anderson School of Management*2009 – Frank P. Ramsey Medal, Decision Analysis Society
- 2012 – Elected Fellow, Institute for Operations Research and the Management Sciences

== Bibliography ==
=== Books ===
- Buffa, Elwood; Sarin, Rakesh (2007). Modern Production / Operations Management, 8th Ed. Wiley. ISBN 9788126513727.
- Baucells, Manel; Sarin, Rakesh (2012). Engineering Happiness: A New Approach for Building a Joyful Life. University of California Press. ISBN 9780520268210.
- Sarin, Rakesh (2012). Perspectives in Operations Management: Essays in Honor of Elwood S. Buffa. Springer. ISBN 9781461531661.

=== Selected articles ===
- Sarin, R.; Wakker, P. P. (1998). "Dynamic Choice and Nonexpected Utility". Journal of Risk and Uncertainty. 17 (2): 87–119. doi:10.1023/A:1007769628257.
- Chow, C. C.; Sarin, R. K. (2001). "Comparative Ignorance and the Ellsberg Paradox". Journal of Risk and Uncertainty. 22 (2): 129–139. doi:10.1023/A:1011157509006.
- Chow, C. C.; Sarin, R. K. (2002). "Known, Unknown, and Unknowable Uncertainties". Theory and Decision. 52 (2): 127–138. doi:10.1023/A:1015544715608.
- Baucells, M.; Sarin, R. K. (2003). "Group Decisions with Multiple Criteria". Management Science. 49 (8): 1105–1118. doi:10.1287/mnsc.49.8.1105.16400.
- Baucells, M.; Sarin, R. K. (2010). "Predicting Utility Under Satiation and Habit Formation". Management Science. 56 (2): 286–301. doi:10.1287/mnsc.1090.1113.
