= Beurling zeta function =

Riemann zeta function analogue replacing ordinary primes with Beurling generalized primes

In mathematics, a Beurling zeta function is an analogue of the Riemann zeta function where the ordinary primes are replaced by a set of Beurling generalized primes: any sequence of real numbers greater than 1 that tend to infinity. These were introduced by Beurling (1937).

A Beurling generalized integer is a number that can be written as a product of Beurling generalized primes. Beurling generalized the usual prime number theorem to Beurling generalized primes. He showed that if the number N(x) of Beurling generalized integers less than x is of the form N(x) = Ax + O(x log^{−γ}x) with γ > 3/2 then the number of Beurling generalized primes less than x is asymptotic to x/log(x), just as for ordinary primes, but if γ = 3/2 then this conclusion need not hold.

== See also ==
- Abstract analytic number theory
