= Erwin Schrödinger International Institute for Mathematics and Physics =

Academic institution in Austria

Coordinates: 48.2226°N 16.3561°E

- Established: 20 April 1993
- Chair: Adrian Constantin
- Location: Vienna, Austria
- Website: www.esi.ac.at

The Erwin Schrödinger International Institute for Mathematics and Physics (ESI) is a visitors oriented research institute in Vienna, Austria. It is located close to the city center in the remodeled historical premises of a seminary in Boltzmanngasse 9 in Vienna's ninth district.

The Institute was founded upon the initiatives of Peter W. Michor and Walter Thirring and opened on 20 April 1993. It was run by the private ESI association under the auspices of the Austrian Ministry of Science until 31 December 2010. Since 1 June 2011 the ESI has been embedded into the University of Vienna. It has close connections with the Faculty of Physics and the Faculty of Mathematics of the University of Vienna.

The ESI hosts high-profile thematic programs, workshops, summer and winter schools, junior and senior research fellowships, as well as a program for research in teams.

The ESI publishes Scientific Reports with detailed records of activities, guests, and related preprints. In 2019, the year before the COVID-19 pandemic, the ESI recorded an all-time high of 1116 participants and 171 preprints related to its activities.

The ESI is managed by the ESI Director, who is supported by two Deputy Directors and reports directly to the Rectorate of the University of Vienna. The Director and the Deputy Directors are part of the ESI Kollegium, which is composed of three professors from the Faculty of Mathematics and three from the Faculty of Physics. The Kollegium oversees the operation of the Institute and decides over proposals for potential future workshops, schools, fellowships, and research in teams at the ESI based on a peer review process and available resources. Decisions on future thematic programs at the ESI are made by a Scientific Advisory Board that is composed of six to eight international peers.

The current ESI Director is Adrian Constantin; the Scientific Advisory Board is chaired by Anton Alekseev.

As of 2020, the Institute awards the annual Medal of the Erwin Schrödinger Institute for Mathematics and Physics (or ESI Medal, for short) to celebrate recent breakthroughs in any area of mathematics or physics. The selection is made by the Scientific Advisory Board based on nominations from previous recipients of the ESI Medal, organizers of thematic programs at the ESI, former ESI Directors, former members of the ESI Scientific Advisory Board, and the president of the ESI Association. The recipients of the ESI Medal to date are

- Anton Alekseev (2020)
- Elliott Lieb (2021)
- Martin Hairer (2022)
- Isabelle Gallagher (2023)
- Piotr T. Chruściel (2024)
- Michele Parrinello (2025)
- Ingrid Daubechies (2026)

== History ==
The private association Erwin Schrödinger International Institute for Mathematical Physics was founded in April 1992 under the auspices of the Austrian Federal Minister of Science, Erhard Busek, and upon the initiatives of Peter W. Michor and Walter Thirring.

Walter Thirring was elected president of the association at the first general assembly on 27 May 1992, with deputies Wolfgang Reiter (to represent the Ministry of Science), Peter W. Michor, Heide Narnhofer, and Julius Wess. A Scientific Advisory Board with the following scientists was set up:

- Paolo Budinich (International School for Advanced Studies (SISSA), Trieste),
- Alain Connes (Institut des Hautes Études Scientifiques (IHÉS), Bures-sur-Yvette),
- Jürg Fröhlich (ETH Zurich),
- Vladimir Drinfeld (National Academy of Sciences of Ukraine (NASU), Kharkiv)
- Ludwig Faddeev (Steklov Institute of Mathematics, St. Petersburg),
- Alberto Galindo Tixairo (Complutense University of Madrid),
- Elliott Lieb (Princeton University)
- Giuseppe Marmo (University of Naples Federico II),
- Peter W. Michor (University of Vienna),
- Heide Narnhofer (University of Vienna),
- Vladimír Souček (Charles University (CUNI), Prague),
- Walter Thirring (University of Vienna),
- Ivan Todorov (University of Sofia),
- Andrzej Trautman (University of Warsaw),
- Alexandre Vinogradov (Moscow State University), and
- Julius Wess (Max Planck Institute for Physics and LMU Munich).

Except for Vladimir Drinfeld and Elliott Lieb, these inaugural members of the Scientific Advisory Board were also the scientists who participated in the workshop Interfaces between Mathematics and Physics in May 1991. The workshop was organized by Peter Michor, Heide Narnhofer, and Walter Thirring. The need for an international, program-based research institute at the intersection of mathematics and physics was discussed at this workshop. The benefits of establishing such an institute in Vienna were explored.

On 20 April 1993 the ESI Association opened the Erwin Schrödinger International Institute for Mathematical Physics. The ESI was initially located in three apartments in Pasteurgasse, one just below the last residence of Erwin Schrödinger, until it moved to its current location in Boltzmanngasse 9 in July 1996. Walter Thirring was the first scientific director of the Institute, Peter Michor the first acting director.

In 2002, the Austrian Ministry of Science and Research commissioned an external evaluation of the activities at the ESI in the first ten years of operation. This evaluation was conducted by a panel composed of Jürgen Jost, Nigel Hitchin (chair), Nicolai Reshetikhin, Robbert Dijkgraaf, and Vincent Rivasseau. A second evaluation to review the following five years of operation was carried out in 2008 by a panel of Jean-Michel Bismut, Robbert Dijkgraaf, Peter Goddard (chair), Felix Otto, and Scott Sheffield.

On 27 July 2010 the ESI was visited by Austrian Federal Minister of Science and Research, Beatrix Karl. She praised the work done at the ESI highly in a press release: “Das Erwin-Schrödinger-Institut ist auf dem Gebiet der mathematischen Physik und Mathematik weltweit führend und wurde für Wissenschafter und Forscher aus der ganzen Welt zu einer wichtigen Forschungs- aber auch Begegnungsstätte. […] Wissenschaft und Forschung am Erwin-Schrödinger-Institut profitieren von dieser Mobilität der Forscherinnen und Forscher, das stärkt auch den Standort Wien."

On 27 October 2010 over seventy independent research institutions (including the ESI) learnt from the Austrian Ministry of Science and Research that their federal funding would be cut. This decision could not be averted by the appeals from the national and international scientific community. The ESI was closed on 31 December 2010. On 21 January 2011 the ESI Association, the Ministry of Science and Research, and the University of Vienna come to an agreement that would enable the ESI to resume operation, not as an independent institute but as a research platform of the same name within the University of Vienna. As such, the ESI was reopened on 1 June 2011.

On 1 January 2016 the name of the ESI was changed from Erwin Schrödinger International Institute for Mathematical Physics to Erwin Schrödinger International Institute for Mathematics and Physics in order to reflect the wider scope of activities carried out at the Institute.
