= Diffiety =

Differential variety

In mathematics, a diffiety (/dəˈfaɪəˌtiː/) is a geometrical object which plays the same role in the modern theory of partial differential equations that algebraic varieties play for algebraic equations, that is, to encode the space of solutions in a more conceptual way. The term was coined in 1984 by Alexandre Mikhailovich Vinogradov as portmanteau from differential variety.

== Intuitive definition ==
In algebraic geometry the main objects of study (varieties) model the space of solutions of a system of algebraic equations (i.e. the zero locus of a set of polynomials), together with all their "algebraic consequences". This means that, applying algebraic operations to this set (e.g. adding those polynomials to each other or multiplying them with any other polynomials) will give rise to the same zero locus. In other words, one can actually consider the zero locus of the algebraic ideal generated by the initial set of polynomials.

When dealing with differential equations, apart from applying algebraic operations as above, one has also the option to differentiate the starting equations, obtaining new differential constraints. Therefore, the differential analogue of a variety should be the space of solutions of a system of differential equations, together with all their "differential consequences". Instead of considering the zero locus of an algebraic ideal, one needs therefore to work with a differential ideal.

An elementary diffiety will consist therefore of the infinite prolongation $\mathcal{E}^\infty$of a differential equation $\mathcal{E}\subset J^k(E,m)$, together with an extra structure provided by a special distribution. Elementary diffieties play the same role in the theory of differential equations as affine algebraic varieties do in the theory of algebraic equations. Accordingly, just like varieties or schemes are composed of irreducible affine varieties or affine schemes, one defines a (non-elementary) diffiety as an object that locally looks like an elementary diffiety.

== Formal definition ==
The formal definition of a diffiety, which relies on the geometric approach to differential equations and their solutions, requires the notions of jets of submanifolds, prolongations, and Cartan distribution, which are recalled below.

=== Jet spaces of submanifolds ===
Let $E$ be an $(m+e)$-dimensional smooth manifold. Two $m$-dimensional submanifolds $M$, $M'$ of $E$ are tangent up to order $k$ at the point $p \in M \cap M' \subset E$ if one can locally describe both submanifolds as zeroes of functions defined in a neighbourhood of $p$, whose derivatives at $p$ agree up to order $k$.

One can show that being tangent up to order $k$ is a coordinate-invariant notion and an equivalence relation. One says also that $M$ and $M'$ have same $k$-th order jet at $p$, and denotes their equivalence class by $[M]^k_p$ or $j^k_p M.$

The $k$-jet space of $k$-submanifolds of $E$, denoted by $J^k(E,m)$, is defined as the set of all $k$-jets of $m$-dimensional submanifolds of $E$ at all points of $E$:
$$J^k(E,m) := \{ [M]^k_p~|~p \in M,~ \text{dim}(M)=m, M \subset E \ \text{ submanifold} \}$$
As any given jet $[M]^k_p$ is locally determined by the derivatives up to order $k$ of the functions describing $M$ around $p$, one can use such functions to build local coordinates $(x^i,u^j_\sigma)$ and provide $J^k(E,m)$ with a natural structure of smooth manifold.

$M$ and $M'$ have the same 1-jet at $p \in E$ while $M$ and $M' '$ have the same 3-jet.

For instance, for $k=1$ one recovers just points in $E$ and for $k=1$ one recovers the Grassmannian of $n$-dimensional subspaces of $TE$. More generally, all the projections $J^k(E) \to J^{k-1} E$ are fibre bundles.

As a particular case, when $E$ has a structure of fibred manifold over an $n$-dimensional manifold $X$, one can consider submanifolds of $E$ given by the graphs of local sections of $\pi: E \to X$. Then the notion of jet of submanifolds boils down to the standard notion of jet of sections, and the jet bundle $J^k(\pi)$ turns out to be an open and dense subset of $J^k (E,m).$

=== Prolongations of submanifolds ===
The $k$-jet prolongation of a submanifold $M \subseteq E$ is

$$j^k(M):M \rightarrow J^k(E,m), \quad p \mapsto [M]_p^k$$

The map $j^k(M)$ is a smooth embedding and its image $M^{k}:= \text{im}(j^k(M))$, called the prolongation of the submanifold $M$, is a submanifold of $J^k (E,m)$ diffeomorphic to $M$.

=== Cartan distribution on jet spaces ===
A space of the form $T_\theta(M^{k})$, where $M$ is any submanifold of $E$ whose prolongation contains the point $\theta \in J^k (E,m)$, is called an $R$-plane (or jet plane, or Cartan plane) at $\theta$. The Cartan distribution on the jet space $J^k(E,m)$ is the distribution $\mathcal{C} \subseteq T (J^k(E,m))$ defined by
$$\mathcal{C}:J^k(E,m)\rightarrow TJ^k(E,m),\qquad \theta\mapsto \mathcal{C}_\theta \subset T_\theta(J^k(E,m))$$
where $\mathcal{C}_{\theta}$ is the span of all $R$-planes at $\theta \in J^k(E,m)$.

=== Differential equations ===
A differential equation of order $k$ on the manifold $E$ is a submanifold $\mathcal{E}\subset J^k(E,m)$; a solution is defined to be an $m$-dimensional submanifold $S\subset \mathcal{E}$ such that $S^k \subseteq \mathcal{E}$. When $E$ is a fibred manifold over $X$, one recovers the notion of partial differential equations on jet bundles and their solutions, which provide a coordinate-free way to describe the analogous notions of mathematical analysis. While jet bundles are enough to deal with many equations arising in geometry, jet spaces of submanifolds provide a greater generality, used to tackle several PDEs imposed on submanifolds of a given manifold, such as Lagrangian submanifolds and minimal surfaces.

As in the jet bundle case, the Cartan distribution is important in the algebro-geometric approach to differential equations because it allows to encode solutions in purely geometric terms. Indeed, a submanifold $S\subset \mathcal{E}$ is a solution if and only if it is an integral manifold for $\mathcal{C}$, i.e. $T_\theta S\subset \mathcal{C}_\theta$ for all $\theta\in S$.

One can also look at the Cartan distribution of a PDE $\mathcal{E}\subset J^k(E,m)$ more intrinsically, defining
$$\mathcal{C}(\mathcal{E}):=\{ \mathcal{C}_\theta\cap T_\theta(\mathcal{E})~|~\theta\in \mathcal{E}\}$$
In this sense, the pair $(\mathcal{E},\mathcal{C}(\mathcal{E}))$ encodes the information about the solutions of the differential equation $\mathcal{E}$.

=== Prolongations of PDEs ===
Given a differential equation $\mathcal{E}\subset J^l(E,m)$ of order $l$, its $k$-th prolongation is defined as
$$\mathcal{E}^k := J^k (\mathcal{E}, m)\cap J^{k+l}(E,m) \subseteq J^{k+l} (E,m)$$
where both $J^k (\mathcal{E}, m)$ and $J^{k+l}(E,m)$ are viewed as embedded submanifolds of $J^k (J^l (E, m), m)$, so that their intersection is well-defined. However, such an intersection is not necessarily a manifold again, hence $\mathcal{E}^k$ may not be an equation of order $k+l$. One therefore usually requires $\mathcal{E}$ to be "nice enough" such that at least its first prolongation is indeed a submanifold of $J^{k+1}(E, m)$.

Below we will assume that the PDE is formally integrable, i.e. all prolongations $\mathcal{E}^k$ are smooth manifolds and all projections $\mathcal{E}^k \to \mathcal{E}^{k-1}$ are smooth surjective submersions. Note that a suitable version of Cartan–Kuranishi prolongation theorem guarantees that, under minor regularity assumptions, checking the smoothness of a finite number of prolongations is enough. Then the inverse limit of the sequence $\{ \mathcal{E}^k \}_{k \in \mathbb{N}}$ extends the definition of prolongation to the case when $k$ goes to infinity, and the space $\mathcal{E}^\infty$ has the structure of a profinite-dimensional manifold.

=== Definition of a diffiety ===
An elementary diffiety is a pair $(\mathcal{E}^\infty,\mathcal{C}(\mathcal{E}^\infty))$ where $\mathcal{E}\subset J^k(E,m)$ is a $k$-th order differential equation on some manifold, $\mathcal{E}^\infty$ its infinite prolongation and $\mathcal{C}(\mathcal{E}^\infty)$ its Cartan distribution. Note that, unlike in the finite case, one can show that the Cartan distribution $\mathcal{C}(\mathcal{E}^\infty)$ is $m$-dimensional and involutive. However, due to the infinite-dimensionality of the ambient manifold, the Frobenius theorem does not hold, therefore $\mathcal{C}(\mathcal{E}^\infty)$ is not integrable

A diffiety is a triple $(\mathcal{O},\mathcal{F}(\mathcal{O}),\mathcal{C}(\mathcal{O}))$, consisting of

- a (generally infinite-dimensional) manifold $\mathcal{O}$
- the algebra of its smooth functions $\mathcal{F}(\mathcal{O})$
- a finite-dimensional distribution $\mathcal{C}(\mathcal{O})$,

such that $(\mathcal{O},\mathcal{F}(\mathcal{O}),\mathcal{C}(\mathcal{O}))$ is locally of the form $(\mathcal{E}^\infty,\mathcal{F}(\mathcal{E}^\infty),\mathcal{C}(\mathcal{E}^\infty))$, where $(\mathcal{E}^\infty,\mathcal{C}(\mathcal{E}^\infty))$ is an elementary diffiety and $\mathcal{F}(\mathcal{E}^\infty)$ denotes the algebra of smooth functions on $\mathcal{E}^\infty$. Here locally means a suitable localisation with respect to the Zariski topology corresponding to the algebra $\mathcal{F}(\mathcal{O})$.

The dimension of $\mathcal{C}(\mathcal{O})$ is called dimension of the diffiety and its denoted by $\mathrm{Dim}(\mathcal{O})$, with a capital D (to distinguish it from the dimension of $\mathcal{O}$ as a manifold).

=== Morphisms of diffieties ===
A morphism between two diffieties $(\mathcal{O}, \mathcal{F}(\mathcal{O}), \mathcal{C}(\mathcal{O}) )$ and $(\mathcal{O}', \mathcal{F}(\mathcal{O}'), \mathcal{C}(\mathcal{O'}) )$ consists of a smooth map $\Phi : \mathcal{O} \rightarrow \mathcal{O}'$ whose pushforward preserves the Cartan distribution, i.e. such that, for every point $\theta\in \mathcal{O}$, one has $d_\theta\Phi(\mathcal{C}_\theta) \subseteq \mathcal{C}_{\Phi(\theta)}$.

Diffieties together with their morphisms define the category of differential equations.

== Applications ==
=== Vinogradov sequence ===
The Vinogradov $\mathcal{C}$-spectral sequence (or, for short, Vinogradov sequence) is a spectral sequence associated to a diffiety, which can be used to investigate certain properties of the formal solution space of a differential equation by exploiting its Cartan distribution $\mathcal{C}$.

Given a diffiety $(\mathcal{O},\mathcal{F}(\mathcal{O}),\mathcal{C}(\mathcal{O}))$, consider the algebra of differential forms over $\mathcal{O}$

$$\Omega(\mathcal{O}):=\sum_{i\ge 0} \Omega^i(\mathcal{O})$$

and the corresponding de Rham complex:

$$C^\infty(\mathcal{O}) \longrightarrow \Omega^1(\mathcal{O}) \longrightarrow \Omega^2(\mathcal{O}) \longrightarrow \cdots$$

Its cohomology groups $H^i(\mathcal{O}):=\text{ker}(\text{d}_i)/\text{im}(\text{d}_{i-1})$ contain some structural information about the PDE; however, due to the Poincaré Lemma, they all vanish locally. In order to extract much more and even local information, one thus needs to take the Cartan distribution into account and introduce a more sophisticated sequence. To this end, let

$$\mathcal{C}\Omega(\mathcal{O})=\sum_{i\ge 0}\mathcal{C}\Omega^i(\mathcal{O}) \subseteq \Omega(\mathcal{O})$$

be the submodule of differential forms over $\mathcal{O}$ whose restriction to the distribution $\mathcal{C}$ vanishes, i.e.

$$\mathcal{C}\Omega^p(\mathcal{O}) := \{ w \in \Omega^p (\mathcal{O}) \mid w(X_1,\cdots,X_p)=0 \quad \forall~X_1,\ldots,X_p\in \mathcal{C}(\mathcal{O}) \}.$$

Note that $\mathcal{C}\Omega^i(\mathcal{O}) \subseteq \Omega^i(\mathcal{O})$ is actually a differential ideal since it is stable w.r.t. the de Rham differential, i.e. $\text{d}(\mathcal{C}\Omega^i(\mathcal{O}))\subset \mathcal{C}\Omega^{i+1}(\mathcal{O})$.

Now let $\mathcal{C}^k\Omega(\mathcal{O})$ be its $k$-th power, i.e. the linear subspace of $\mathcal{C}\Omega$ generated by $w_1 \wedge \cdots \wedge w_k,~w_i\in \mathcal{C}\Omega$. Then one obtains a filtration

$$\Omega(\mathcal{O}) \supset \mathcal{C}\Omega(\mathcal{O}) \supset \mathcal{C}^2\Omega(\mathcal{O}) \supset \cdots$$

and since all ideals $\mathcal{C}^k\Omega$ are stable, this filtration completely determines the following spectral sequence:

$$\mathcal{C}E(\mathcal{O})=\{E^{p,q}_r,\text{d}_r^{p,q}\}\qquad\text{where}\qquad E^{p,q}_0 := \frac{\mathcal{C}^p\Omega^{p+q}(\mathcal{O})}{\mathcal{C}^{p+1}\Omega^{p+q}(\mathcal{O})},\qquad\text{and}\qquad E_{r+1}^{p,q} := H(E_{r}^{p,q},d_r^{p,q}).$$

The filtration above is finite in each degree, i.e. for every $k \geq 0$

$$\Omega^k(\mathcal{O}) \supset \mathcal{C}^1\Omega^k(\mathcal{O}) \supset \cdots \supset \mathcal{C}^{k+1}\Omega^k(\mathcal{O})= 0,$$

so that the spectral sequence converges to the de Rham cohomology $H(\mathcal{O})$ of the diffiety. One can therefore analyse the terms of the spectral sequence order by order to recover information on the original PDE. For instance:

- $E_1^{0,n}$ corresponds to action functionals constrained by the PDE $\mathcal{E}$. In particular, for $\mathcal{L}\in E_1^{0,n}$, the corresponding Euler–Lagrange equation is $\text{d}_1^{0,n} \mathcal{L}=0$.
- $E_1^{0,n-1}$ corresponds to conservation laws for solutions of $\mathcal{E}$.
- $E_2$ is interpreted as characteristic classes of bordisms of solutions of $\mathcal{E}$.

Many higher-order terms do not have an interpretation yet.

==== Variational bicomplex ====
As a particular case, starting with a fibred manifold $\pi: E \to X$ and its jet bundle $J^k (\pi)$ instead of the jet space $J^k (E,m)$, instead of the $\mathcal{C}$-spectral sequence one obtains the slightly less general variational bicomplex. More precisely, any bicomplex determines two spectral sequences: one of the two spectral sequences determined by the variational bicomplex is exactly the Vinogradov $\mathcal{C}$-spectral sequence. However, the variational bicomplex was developed independently from the Vinogradov sequence.

Similarly to the terms of the spectral sequence, many terms of the variational bicomplex can be given a physical interpretation in classical field theory: for example, one obtains cohomology classes corresponding to action functionals, conserved currents, gauge charges, etc.

=== Secondary calculus ===
Vinogradov developed a theory, known as secondary calculus, to formalise in cohomological terms the idea of a differential calculus on the space of solutions of a given system of PDEs (i.e. the space of integral manifolds of a given diffiety).

In other words, secondary calculus provides substitutes for functions, vector fields, differential forms, differential operators, etc., on a (generically) very singular space where these objects cannot be defined in the usual (smooth) way on the space of solution. Furthermore, the space of these new objects are naturally endowed with the same algebraic structures of the space of the original objects.

More precisely, consider the horizontal De Rham complex $\overline{\Omega}^\bullet(\mathcal{O}) := \Gamma (\wedge^\bullet \mathcal{C(O)}^*)$ of a diffiety, which can be seen as the leafwise de Rham complex of the involutive distribution $\mathcal{C(O)}$or, equivalently, the Lie algebroid complex of the Lie algebroid $\mathcal{C(O)}$. Then the complex $\overline{\Omega}^\bullet(\mathcal{O})$ becomes naturally a commutative DG algebra together with a suitable differential $\overline{d}$. Then, possibly tensoring with the normal bundle $\mathcal{V} := T\mathcal{O}/\mathcal{C(O)} \to \mathcal{O}$, its cohomology is used to define the following "secondary objects":

- secondary functions are elements of the cohomology $\overline{H}^\bullet(\mathcal{O}) = H^\bullet (\overline{\Omega}^\bullet(\mathcal{O}),\overline{d})$, which is naturally a commutative DG algebra (it is actually the first page of the $\mathcal{C}$-spectral sequence discussed above);
- secondary vector fields are elements of the cohomology $\overline{H}^\bullet(\mathcal{O}, \mathcal{V}) = H^\bullet (\overline{\Omega}^\bullet(\mathcal{O} \otimes \mathcal{V}),\overline{d})$, which is naturally a Lie algebra; moreover, it forms a graded Lie-Rinehart algebra together with $\overline{H}^\bullet(\mathcal{O})$;
- secondary differential $p$-forms are elements of the cohomology $\overline{H}^\bullet(\mathcal{O}, \wedge^p \mathcal{V}^*) = H^\bullet (\overline{\Omega}^\bullet(\mathcal{O} \otimes \wedge^p \mathcal{V}^*),\overline{d})$, which is naturally a commutative DG algebra.

Secondary calculus can also be related to the covariant Phase Space, i.e. the solution space of the Euler–Lagrange equations associated to a Lagrangian field theory.

== See also ==
- Secondary calculus and cohomological physics
- Partial differential equations on Jet bundles
- Differential ideal
- Differential calculus over commutative algebras

Another way of generalizing ideas from algebraic geometry is differential algebraic geometry.
