= Edmund Landau =

German mathematician (1877–1938)

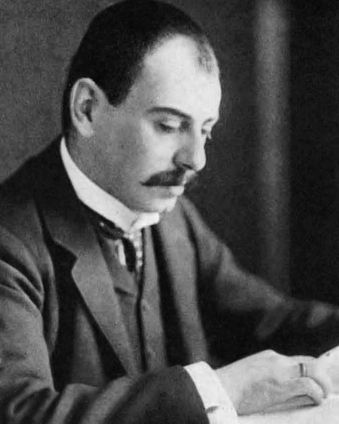
- Born: Edmund Georg Hermann Landau; 14 February 1877; Berlin, Kingdom of Prussia, German Empire
- Died: 19 February 1938 (aged 61); Berlin, Free State of Prussia, Nazi Germany
- Education: University of Berlin
- Known for: Distribution of prime numbers Landau prime ideal theorem
- Spouse: Marianne Ehrlich
- Scientific career
- Fields: Number theory Complex analysis
- Workplaces: University of Berlin; University of Göttingen; Hebrew University of Jerusalem
- Doctoral advisor: Georg Frobenius; Lazarus Fuchs
- Doctoral students: Binyamin Amirà; Paul Bernays; Harald Bohr; Gustav Doetsch; Hans Heilbronn; Grete Hermann; Dunham Jackson; Erich Kamke; Aubrey Kempner; Alexander Ostrowski; Carl Ludwig Siegel; Arnold Walfisz; Vojtěch Jarník

Edmund Georg Hermann Landau (14 February 1877 – 19 February 1938) was a German mathematician who worked in the fields of number theory and complex analysis.

== Biography ==
Edmund Landau was born to a Jewish family in Berlin. His father was Leopold Landau, a gynecologist, and his mother was Johanna Jacoby. Landau studied mathematics at the University of Berlin, receiving his doctorate in 1899 and his habilitation (the post-doctoral qualification required to teach in German universities) in 1901. His doctoral thesis was 14 pages long.

In 1895, his paper on scoring chess tournaments is the earliest use of eigenvector centrality.

Landau taught at the University of Berlin from 1899 to 1909, after which he held a chair at the University of Göttingen. He married Marianne Ehrlich, the daughter of the Nobel Prize-winning biologist Paul Ehrlich, in 1905.

At the 1912 International Congress of Mathematicians Landau listed four problems in number theory about primes that he said were particularly hard using current mathematical methods. They remain unsolved to this day and are now known as Landau's problems.

During the 1920s, Landau was instrumental in establishing the Mathematics Institute at the nascent Hebrew University of Jerusalem. Intent on eventually settling in Jerusalem, he taught himself Hebrew and delivered a lecture entitled Solved and unsolved problems in elementary number theory in Hebrew on 2 April 1925 during the university's groundbreaking ceremonies. He negotiated with the university's president, Judah Magnes, regarding a position at the university and the building that was to house the Mathematics Institute.

Landau and his family emigrated to Mandatory Palestine in 1927 and he began teaching at the Hebrew University. The family had difficulty adjusting to the primitive living standards then available in Jerusalem. In addition, Landau became a pawn in a struggle for control of the university between Magnes and Chaim Weizmann and Albert Einstein. Magnes suggested that Landau be appointed Rector of the university, but Einstein and Weizmann supported Selig Brodetsky. Landau was disgusted by the dispute and decided to return to Göttingen, remaining there until he was forced out by the Nazi regime after the Machtergreifung in 1933, in a boycott organized by Oswald Teichmüller. Thereafter, he lectured only outside Germany. He moved to Berlin in 1934, where he died in early 1938 of natural causes.

In 1903, Landau gave a much simpler proof than was then known of the prime number theorem and later presented the first systematic treatment of analytic number theory in the Handbuch der Lehre von der Verteilung der Primzahlen (the "Handbuch"). He also made important contributions to complex analysis.

G. H. Hardy and Hans Heilbronn wrote that "No one was ever more passionately devoted to mathematics than Landau".

== Works ==
- Handbuch der Lehre von der Verteilung der Primzahlen, Taubner, Leipzig, 1909.
- Darstellung und Begründung einiger neuerer Ergebnisse der Funktionentheorie, Springer, 1916.
- Einführung in die elementare und analytische Theorie der algebraischen Zahlen und Ideale, 1918.
- Vorlesungen über Zahlentheorie, 3 Vols, S. Hirzel, Leipzig, 1927.
- Grundlagen der Analysis, Akademische Verlagsgesellschaft, Leipzig, 1930.
- Einführung in die Differential- und Integralrechnung, P. Noordhoff N. V., Groningen, 1934.
- Über einige neuere Fortschritte der additiven Zahlentheorie, Cambridge University Press, London, 1937.

=== Translated works ===
- Foundations of Analysis, Chelsea Pub Co. ISBN 0-8218-2693-X.
- Differential and Integral Calculus, American Mathematical Society. ISBN 0-8218-2830-4.
- Elementary Number Theory, American Mathematical Society. ISBN 0-8218-2004-4.

== See also ==
- Landau's function
- Landau prime ideal theorem
- Landau's problems
- Landau's symbol (Big O notation)
- Landau–Kolmogorov inequality
- Landau–Ramanujan constant
- Landau's problem on the Dirichlet eta function
- Landau kernel
