= Leopold Landau =

German gynecologist (1848–1920)

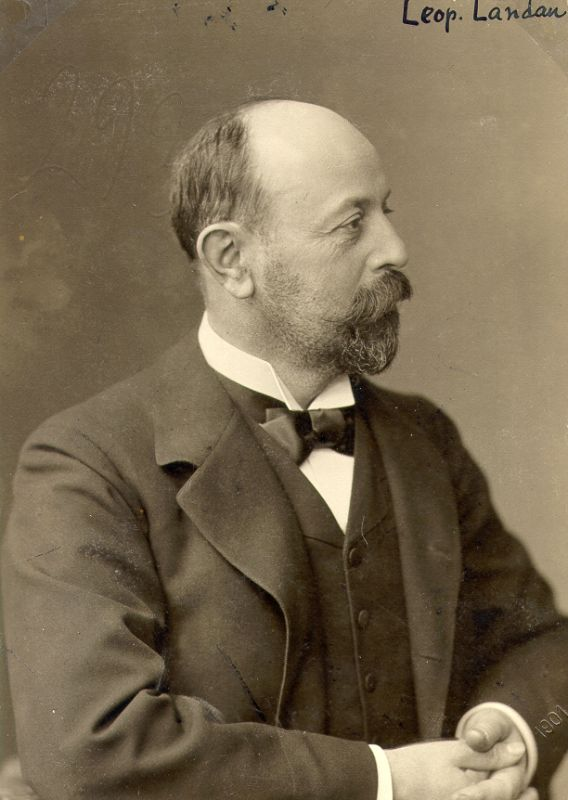
Leopold Landau (1901)

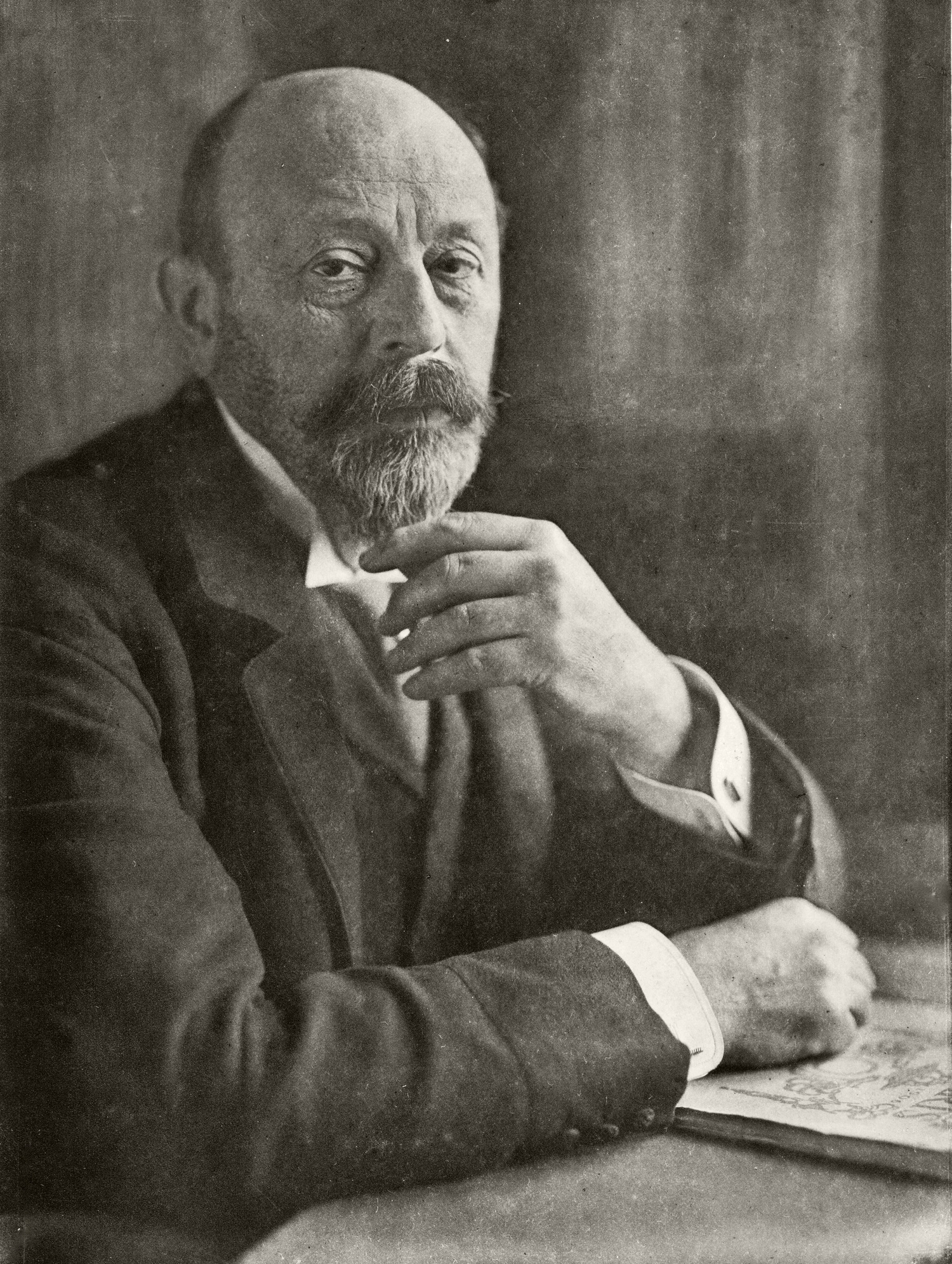
Leopold Landau

Leopold Landau (July 16, 1848 – December 28, 1920) was a German gynecologist born in Warsaw.

== Life and career ==
Landau studied medicine at the Universities of Breslau, Würzburg and Berlin, obtaining his doctorate at the latter institution in 1870. After serving as an assistant surgeon during the Franco-Prussian War, he was a lecturer in gynecology at the University of Breslau (1872–76). Afterwards, he returned to Berlin as a lecturer of gynecology, where in 1893 he became a full professor.

In 1892 with his brother, Theodor Landau (1861–1932), he opened a Frauenklinik (Women's clinic) in Berlin that became well known throughout Germany. From here, he conducted medical research, publishing noted works on myoma and radical vaginal operations. With his brother, he was co-author of Die Vaginale Radicaloperation: Technik und Geschichte (1896), being later translated into English and published as The history and technique of the vaginal radical operation (1897).

Landau was active in the Zionist movement and one of the founders of the Berlin Akademie für die Wissenschaft des Judentums (Berlin Academy for the Science of Judaism).

He died in Berlin. His son was the famous mathematician Edmund Landau (1877-1938).

== Selected writings ==
- Die Wanderniere der Frauen, 1881.
- Die Wanderleber und der Hängebauch der Frauen, 1882.
- Die Vaginale Radicaloperation: Technik und Geschichte (with Theodor Landau), 1896.
- Anatomische und Klinische Beiträge zur Lehre von der Myomen am Weiblichen Sexualapparat, 1899.
