= Landau's function =

Mathematical function

In mathematics, Landau's function g(n), named after Edmund Landau, is defined for every natural number n to be the largest order of an element of the symmetric group S_{n}. Equivalently, g(n) is the largest least common multiple (lcm) of any partition of n, or the maximum number of times a permutation of n elements can be recursively applied to itself before it returns to its starting sequence.

For instance, 5 = 2 + 3 and lcm(2,3) = 6. No other partition of 5 yields a bigger lcm, so g(5) = 6. An element of order 6 in the group S_{5} can be written in cycle notation as (1 2) (3 4 5). Note that the same argument applies to the number 6, that is, g(6) = 6. There are arbitrarily long sequences of consecutive numbers n, n + 1, ..., n + m on which the function g is constant.

The integer sequence g(0) = 1, g(1) = 1, g(2) = 2, g(3) = 3, g(4) = 4, g(5) = 6, g(6) = 6, g(7) = 12, g(8) = 15, ... (sequence A000793 in the OEIS) is named after Edmund Landau, who proved in 1902 that

$$\lim_{n\to\infty}\frac{\ln(g(n))}{\sqrt{n \ln(n)}} = 1$$

(where ln denotes the natural logarithm). Equivalently (using little-o notation), $g(n) = e^{(1+o(1))\sqrt{n\ln n}}$.

More precisely,

$$\ln g(n)=\sqrt{n\ln n}\left(1+\frac{\ln\ln n-1}{2\ln n}-\frac{(\ln\ln n)^2-6\ln\ln n+9}{8(\ln n)^2}+O\left(\left(\frac{\ln\ln n}{\ln n}\right)^3\right)\right).$$

If $\pi(x)-\operatorname{Li}(x)=O(R(x))$, where $\pi$ denotes the prime counting function, $\operatorname{Li}$ the logarithmic integral function with inverse $\operatorname{Li}^{-1}$, and we may take $R(x)=x\exp\bigl(-c(\ln x)^{3/5}(\ln\ln x)^{-1/5}\bigr)$ for some constant c > 0 by Ford, then

$$\ln g(n)=\sqrt{\operatorname{Li}^{-1}(n)}+O\bigl(R(\sqrt{n\ln n})\ln n\bigr).$$

The statement that

$$\ln g(n)<\sqrt{\mathrm{Li}^{-1}(n)}$$

for all sufficiently large n is equivalent to the Riemann hypothesis.

It can be shown that

$$g(n)\le e^{n/e}$$

with the only equality between the functions at n = 0, and indeed

$g(n) \le \exp\left(1.05314\sqrt{n\ln n}\right).$
