= Jet bundle =

Construction in differential topology

In differential topology, the jet bundle is a certain construction that makes a new smooth fiber bundle out of a given smooth fiber bundle. It makes it possible to write differential equations on sections of a fiber bundle in an invariant form. Jets may also be seen as the coordinate free versions of Taylor expansions.

Historically, jet bundles are attributed to Charles Ehresmann, and were an advance on the method (prolongation) of Élie Cartan, of dealing geometrically with higher derivatives, by imposing differential form conditions on newly introduced formal variables. Jet bundles are sometimes called sprays, although sprays usually refer more specifically to the associated vector field induced on the corresponding bundle (e.g., the geodesic spray on Finsler manifolds.)

Since the early 1980s, jet bundles have appeared as a concise way to describe phenomena associated with the derivatives of maps, particularly those associated with the calculus of variations. Consequently, the jet bundle is now recognized as the correct domain for a geometrical covariant field theory and much work is done in general relativistic formulations of fields using this approach.

== Jets ==
Suppose M is an m-dimensional manifold and that (E, π, M) is a fiber bundle. For p ∈ M, let Γ(p) denote the set of all local sections whose domain contains p. Let $I = (I(1), I(2), ..., I(m))$ be a multi-index (an m-tuple of non-negative integers, not necessarily in ascending order), then define:

$$\begin{align}
|I| &:= \sum_{i=1}^m I(i) \\
\frac{\partial^{|I|}}{\partial x^I} &:= \prod_{i=1}^m \left( \frac{\partial}{\partial x^i} \right)^{I(i)}.
\end{align}$$

Define the local sections σ, η ∈ Γ(p) to have the same r-jet at p if

$$\left.\frac{\partial^{|I|} \sigma^\alpha}{\partial x^I}\right|_{p} =
\left.\frac{\partial^{|I|} \eta^\alpha}{\partial x^I}\right|_{p}, \quad 0 \leq |I| \leq r.$$

The relation that two maps have the same r-jet is an equivalence relation. An r-jet is an equivalence class under this relation, and the r-jet with representative σ is denoted $j^r_p\sigma$. The integer r is also called the order of the jet, p is its source and σ(p) is its target.

== Jet manifolds ==
The r-th jet manifold of π is the set

$$J^r (\pi) = \left \{j^r_p\sigma:p \in M, \sigma \in \Gamma(p) \right \}.$$

We may define projections π_{r} and π_{r,0} called the source and target projections respectively, by

$$\begin{cases}
\pi_r: J^r(\pi) \to M \\
j^r_p\sigma \mapsto p
\end{cases}, \qquad \begin{cases}
\pi_{r, 0}: J^r(\pi) \to E \\
j^r_p\sigma \mapsto \sigma(p)
\end{cases}$$

If 1 ≤ k ≤ r, then the k-jet projection is the function π_{r,k} defined by

$$\begin{cases}
\pi_{r, k}: J^r(\pi) \to J^{k}(\pi) \\
j^r_p\sigma \mapsto j^{k}_p\sigma
\end{cases}$$

From this definition, it is clear that π_{r} = π o π_{r,0} and that if 0 ≤ m ≤ k, then π_{r,m} = π_{k,m} o π_{r,k}. It is conventional to regard π_{r,r} as the identity map on J ^{r}(π) and to identify J ^{0}(π) with E.

The functions π_{r,k}, π_{r,0} and π_{r} are smooth surjective submersions.

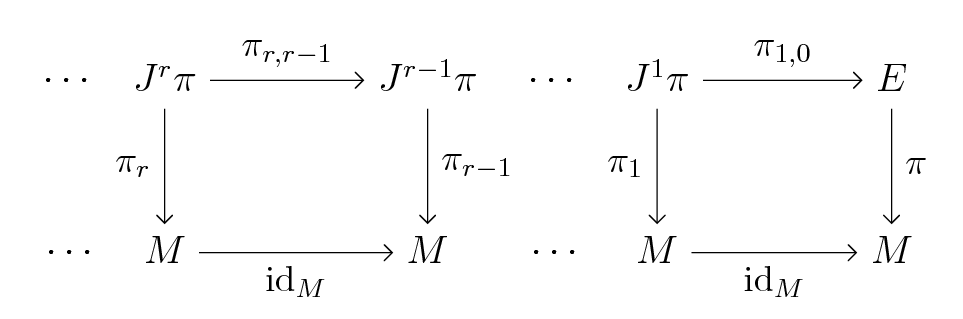

A coordinate system on E will generate a coordinate system on J ^{r}(π). Let (U, u) be an adapted coordinate chart on E, where u = (x^{i}, u^{α}). The induced coordinate chart (U^{r}, u^{r}) on J ^{r}(π) is defined by

$$\begin{align}
U^r &= \left\{j^r_p \sigma: p \in M, \sigma(p) \in U\right\} \\
u^r &= \left(x^i, u^\alpha, u^\alpha_I\right)
\end{align}$$

where

$$\begin{align}
x^i\left(j^r_p\sigma\right) &= x^i(p) \\
u^\alpha\left(j^r_p\sigma\right) &= u^\alpha(\sigma(p))
\end{align}$$

and the $n \left(\binom{m+r}{r} - 1\right)$ functions known as the derivative coordinates:

$$\begin{cases}
u^\alpha_I:U^k \to \mathbf{R} \\
u^\alpha_I\left(j^r_p\sigma\right) = \left.\frac{\partial^{|I|} \sigma^\alpha}{\partial x^I}\right|_p
\end{cases}$$

Given an atlas of adapted charts (U, u) on E, the corresponding collection of charts (U ^{r}, u ^{r}) is a finite-dimensional C^{∞} atlas on J ^{r}(π).

== Jet bundles ==
Since the atlas on each $J^r(\pi)$ defines a manifold, the triples $(J^r(\pi), \pi_{r,k}, J^k(\pi))$, $(J^r(\pi), \pi_{r,0}, E)$ and $(J^r(\pi), \pi_{r}, M)$ all define fibered manifolds. In particular, if $(E, \pi, M)$is a fiber bundle, the triple $(J^r(\pi), \pi_{r}, M)$ defines the r-th jet bundle of π.

If W ⊂ M is an open submanifold, then

$$J^r \left(\pi|_{\pi^{-1}(W)}\right) \cong \pi^{-1}_r(W).\,$$

If p ∈ M, then the fiber $\pi^{-1}_r(p)\,$ is denoted $J^r_p(\pi)$.

Let σ be a local section of π with domain W ⊂ M. The r-th jet prolongation of σ is the map $j^r\sigma: W \rightarrow J^r(\pi)$ defined by

$$(j^r \sigma)(p) = j^r_p \sigma. \,$$

Note that $\pi_r \circ j^r \sigma =\mathbb{id}_W$, so $j^r\sigma$ really is a section. In local coordinates, $j^r\sigma$ is given by

$$\left(\sigma^\alpha, \frac{\partial^{|I|} \sigma^\alpha}{\partial x^{I}}\right) \qquad 1 \leq |I| \leq r. \,$$

We identify $j^ 0\sigma$ with $\sigma$ .

=== Algebro-geometric perspective ===
An independently motivated construction of the sheaf of sections $\Gamma J^k\left(\pi_{TM}\right)$ is given.

Consider a diagonal map $\Delta_n: M \to \prod_{i=1}^{n+1} M$, where the smooth manifold $M$ is a locally ringed space by $C^k(U)$ for each open $U$. Let $\mathcal{I}$ be the ideal sheaf of $\Delta_n(M)$, equivalently let $\mathcal{I}$ be the sheaf of smooth germs which vanish on $\Delta_n(M)$ for all $0 < n \leq k$. The pullback of the quotient sheaf ${\Delta_n}^*\left(\mathcal{I}/\mathcal{I}^{n+1}\right)$ from $\prod_{i=1}^{n+1} M$ to $M$ by $\Delta_n$ is the sheaf of k-jets.

The direct limit of the sequence of injections given by the canonical inclusions $\mathcal{I}^{n+1} \hookrightarrow \mathcal{I}^n$ of sheaves, gives rise to the infinite jet sheaf $\mathcal{J}^\infty(TM)$. Observe that by the direct limit construction it is a filtered ring.

=== Example ===
If π is the trivial bundle (M × R, pr_{1}, M), then there is a canonical diffeomorphism between the first jet bundle $J^1(\pi)$ and T*M × R. To construct this diffeomorphism, for each σ in $\Gamma_M(\pi)$ write $\bar{\sigma} = pr_2 \circ \sigma \in C^\infty(M)\,$.

Then, whenever p ∈ M

$$j^1_p \sigma = \left\{ \psi : \psi \in \Gamma_p (\pi); \bar{\psi}(p) = \bar{\sigma}(p); d\bar{\psi}_p = d\bar{\sigma}_p \right\}. \,$$

Consequently, the mapping

$$\begin{cases}
J^1(\pi) \to T^*M \times \mathbf{R} \\
j^1_p\sigma \mapsto \left(d\bar{\sigma}_p, \bar{\sigma}(p)\right)
\end{cases}$$

is well-defined and is clearly injective. Writing it out in coordinates shows that it is a diffeomorphism, because if (x^{i}, u) are coordinates on M × R, where u = id_{R} is the identity coordinate, then the derivative coordinates u_{i} on J^{1}(π) correspond to the coordinates ∂_{i} on T*M.

Likewise, if π is the trivial bundle (R × M, pr_{1}, R), then there exists a canonical diffeomorphism between $J^1(\pi)$and R × TM.

== Contact structure ==
The space J^{r}(π) carries a natural distribution, that is, a sub-bundle of the tangent bundle TJ^{r}(π)), called the Cartan distribution. The Cartan distribution is spanned by all tangent planes to graphs of holonomic sections; that is, sections of the form j^{r}φ for φ a section of π.

The annihilator of the Cartan distribution is a space of differential one-forms called contact forms, on J^{r}(π). The space of differential one-forms on J^{r}(π) is denoted by $\Lambda^1J^r(\pi)$ and the space of contact forms is denoted by $\Lambda_C^r\pi$. A one form is a contact form provided its pullback along every prolongation is zero. In other words, $\theta\in\Lambda^1J^r\pi$ is a contact form if and only if

$$\left(j^{r+1}\sigma\right)^*\theta = 0$$

for all local sections σ of π over M.

The Cartan distribution is the main geometrical structure on jet spaces and plays an important role in the geometric theory of partial differential equations. The Cartan distributions are completely non-integrable. In particular, they are not involutive. The dimension of the Cartan distribution grows with the order of the jet space. However, on the space of infinite jets J^{∞} the Cartan distribution becomes involutive and finite-dimensional: its dimension coincides with the dimension of the base manifold M.

=== Example ===
Consider the case (E, π, M), where E ≃ R^{2} and M ≃ R. Then, (J^{1}(π), π, M) defines the first jet bundle, and may be coordinated by (x, u, u_{1}), where

$$\begin{align}
x\left(j^1_p\sigma\right) &= x(p) = x \\
u\left(j^1_p\sigma\right) &= u(\sigma(p)) = u(\sigma(x)) = \sigma(x) \\
u_1\left(j^1_p\sigma\right) &= \left.\frac{\partial \sigma}{\partial x}\right|_p = \sigma'(x)
\end{align}$$

for all p ∈ M and σ in Γ_{p}(π). A general 1-form on J^{1}(π) takes the form

$$\theta = a(x, u, u_1)dx + b(x, u, u_1)du + c(x, u, u_1)du_1\,$$

A section σ in Γ_{p}(π) has first prolongation

$$j^1\sigma = (u, u_1) = \left(\sigma(p), \left. \frac{\partial \sigma}{\partial x} \right|_p \right).$$

Hence, (j^{1}σ)*θ can be calculated as

$$\begin{align}
\left(j^1_p\sigma\right)^* \theta
&= \theta \circ j^1_p\sigma \\
&= a(x, \sigma(x), \sigma'(x))dx + b(x, \sigma(x), \sigma'(x))d(\sigma(x)) + c(x, \sigma(x),\sigma'(x))d(\sigma'(x)) \\
&= a(x, \sigma(x), \sigma'(x))dx + b(x, \sigma(x), \sigma'(x))\sigma'(x)dx + c(x, \sigma(x), \sigma'(x))\sigma''(x)dx \\
&= [a(x, \sigma(x), \sigma'(x)) + b(x, \sigma(x), \sigma'(x))\sigma'(x) + c(x, \sigma(x), \sigma'(x))\sigma''(x) ]dx
\end{align}$$

This will vanish for all sections σ if and only if c = 0 and a = −bσ′(x). Hence, θ = b(x, u, u_{1})θ_{0} must necessarily be a multiple of the basic contact form θ_{0} = du − u_{1}dx. Proceeding to the second jet space J^{2}(π) with additional coordinate u_{2}, such that

$$u_2(j^2_p\sigma) = \left.\frac{\partial^2 \sigma}{\partial x^2}\right|_p = \sigma''(x)\,$$

a general 1-form has the construction

$$\theta = a(x, u, u_1,u_2)dx + b(x, u, u_1,u_2)du + c(x, u, u_1,u_2)du_1 + e(x, u, u_1,u_2)du_2\,$$

This is a contact form if and only if

$$\begin{align}
\left(j^2_p\sigma\right)^* \theta
&= \theta \circ j^2_p\sigma \\
&= a(x, \sigma(x), \sigma'(x), \sigma''(x))dx + b(x, \sigma(x), \sigma'(x),\sigma''(x))d(\sigma(x)) +{} \\
&\qquad\qquad c(x, \sigma(x), \sigma'(x),\sigma''(x))d(\sigma'(x)) + e(x, \sigma(x), \sigma'(x),\sigma''(x))d(\sigma''(x)) \\
&= adx + b\sigma'(x)dx + c\sigma''(x)dx + e\sigma'''(x)dx \\
&= [a + b\sigma'(x) + c\sigma''(x) + e\sigma'''(x)]dx\\
&= 0
\end{align}$$

which implies that e = 0 and a = −bσ′(x) − cσ′′(x). Therefore, θ is a contact form if and only if

$$\theta = b(x, \sigma(x), \sigma'(x))\theta_{0} + c(x, \sigma(x), \sigma'(x))\theta_1,$$

where θ_{1} = du_{1} − u_{2}dx is the next basic contact form (Note that here we are identifying the form θ_{0} with its pull-back $\left(\pi_{2,1}\right)^{*}\theta_{0}$ to J^{2}(π)).

In general, providing x, u ∈ R, a contact form on J^{r+1}(π) can be written as a linear combination of the basic contact forms

$$\theta_k = du_k - u_{k+1}dx \qquad k = 0, \ldots, r - 1\,$$

where

$$u_k\left(j^k \sigma\right) = \left.\frac{\partial^k \sigma}{\partial x^k}\right|_p.$$

Similar arguments lead to a complete characterization of all contact forms.

In local coordinates, every contact one-form on J^{r+1}(π) can be written as a linear combination

$$\theta = \sum_{|I|=0}^r P_\alpha^I \theta_I^\alpha$$

with smooth coefficients $P^\alpha_i(x^i, u^\alpha, u^\alpha_I)$ of the basic contact forms

$$\theta_I^\alpha = du^\alpha_I - u^\alpha_{I,i} dx^i\,$$

|I| is known as the order of the contact form $\theta_i^\alpha$. Note that contact forms on J^{r+1}(π) have orders at most r. Contact forms provide a characterization of those local sections of π_{r+1} which are prolongations of sections of π.

Let ψ ∈ Γ_{W}(π_{r+1}), then ψ = j^{r+1}σ where σ ∈ Γ_{W}(π) if and only if $\psi^* (\theta|_{W}) = 0, \forall \theta \in \Lambda_C^1 \pi_{r+1,r}.\,$

== Vector fields ==
A general vector field on the total space E, coordinated by $(x, u) \mathrel\stackrel{\mathrm{def}}{=} \left(x^i, u^\alpha\right)\,$, is

$$V \mathrel\stackrel{\mathrm{def}}{=} \rho^i(x, u)\frac{\partial}{\partial x^i} + \phi^{\alpha}(x, u)\frac{\partial}{\partial u^\alpha}.\,$$

A vector field is called horizontal, meaning that all the vertical coefficients vanish, if $\phi^\alpha$ = 0.

A vector field is called vertical, meaning that all the horizontal coefficients vanish, if ρ^{i} = 0.

For fixed (x, u), we identify

$$V_{(x, u)} \mathrel\stackrel{\mathrm{def}}{=} \rho^i(x, u) \frac{\partial}{\partial x^i} + \phi^{\alpha}(x, u) \frac{\partial}{\partial u^\alpha}\,$$

having coordinates (x, u, ρ^{i}, φ^{α}), with an element in the fiber T_{xu}E of TE over (x, u) in E, called a tangent vector in TE. A section

$$\begin{cases}
\psi : E \to TE \\
(x, u) \mapsto \psi(x, u) = V
\end{cases}$$

is called a vector field on E with

$$V = \rho^i(x, u) \frac{\partial}{\partial x^i} + \phi^\alpha(x, u) \frac{\partial}{\partial u^\alpha}$$

and ψ in Γ(TE).

The jet bundle J^{r}(π) is coordinated by $(x, u, w) \mathrel\stackrel{\mathrm{def}}{=} \left(x^i, u^\alpha, w_i^\alpha\right)\,$. For fixed (x, u, w), identify

$$V_{(x, u, w)} \mathrel\stackrel{\mathrm{def}}{=}
V^i(x, u, w) \frac{\partial}{\partial x^i} +
V^\alpha(x, u, w) \frac{\partial}{\partial u^\alpha} +
V^\alpha_i(x, u, w) \frac{\partial}{\partial w^\alpha_i} +
V^\alpha_{i_1 i_2}(x, u, w) \frac{\partial}{\partial w^\alpha_{i_1 i_2}} + \cdots +
V^\alpha_{i_1 \cdots i_r}(x, u, w) \frac{\partial}{\partial w^\alpha_{i_1 \cdots i_r}}$$

having coordinates

$$\left(x, u, w, v^\alpha_i, v^\alpha_{i_1 i_2}, \cdots, v^\alpha_{i_1 \cdots i_r}\right),$$

with an element in the fiber $T_{xuw}(J^r\pi)$ of TJ^{r}(π) over (x, u, w) ∈ J^{r}(π), called a tangent vector in TJ^{r}(π). Here,

$$v^\alpha_i, v^\alpha_{i_1 i_2}, \ldots, v^\alpha_{i_1 \cdots i_r}$$

are real-valued functions on J^{r}(π). A section

$$\begin{cases}
\Psi : J^r(\pi) \to  TJ^r(\pi) \\
(x, u, w) \mapsto \Psi(u, w) = V
\end{cases}$$

is a vector field on J^{r}(π), and we say $\Psi \in \Gamma(T\left(J^r\pi\right)).$

== Partial differential equations ==
Let (E, π, M) be a fiber bundle. An r-th order partial differential equation on π is a closed embedded submanifold S of the jet manifold J^{r}(π). A solution is a local section σ ∈ Γ_{W}(π) satisfying $j^{r}_p\sigma \in S$, for all p in M.

Consider an example of a first order partial differential equation.

=== Example ===
Let π be the trivial bundle (R^{2} × R, pr_{1}, R^{2}) with global coordinates (x^{1}, x^{2}, u^{1}). Then the map F : J^{1}(π) → R defined by

$$F = u^1_1 u^1_2 - 2x^2 u^1$$

gives rise to the differential equation

$$S = \left\{j^1_p\sigma \in J^1\pi\ :\ \left(u^1_1u^1_2 - 2x^2u^1\right)\left(j^1_p\sigma\right) = 0\right\}$$

which can be written

$$\frac{\partial \sigma}{\partial x^1}\frac{\partial \sigma}{\partial x^2} - 2x^2\sigma = 0.$$

The particular

$$\begin{cases}
\sigma : \mathbf{R}^2 \to \mathbf{R}^2 \times \mathbf{R} \\
\sigma(p_1, p_2) = \left( p^1, p^2, p^1(p^2)^2 \right)
\end{cases}$$

has first prolongation given by

$$j^1\sigma\left(p_1, p_2\right) = \left( p^1, p^2, p^1\left(p^2\right)^2, \left(p^2\right)^2, 2p^1 p^2 \right)$$

and is a solution of this differential equation, because

$$\begin{align}
\left(u^1_1 u^1_2 - 2x^2 u^1 \right)\left(j^1_p\sigma\right)
&= u^1_1\left(j^1_p\sigma\right)u^1_2\left(j^1_p\sigma\right) - 2x^2\left(j^1_p\sigma\right)u^1\left(j^1_p\sigma\right) \\
&= \left(p^2\right)^2 \cdot 2p^1 p^2 - 2 \cdot p^2 \cdot p^1\left(p^2\right)^2 \\
&= 2p^1\left(p^2\right)^3 - 2p^1 \left(p^2\right)^3 \\
&= 0
\end{align}$$

and so $j^1_p\sigma \in S$ for every p ∈ R^{2}.

== Jet prolongation ==
A local diffeomorphism ψ : J^{r}(π) → J^{r}(π) defines a contact transformation of order r if it preserves the contact ideal, meaning that if θ is any contact form on J^{r}(π), then ψ*θ is also a contact form.

The flow generated by a vector field V^{r} on the jet space J^{r}(π) forms a one-parameter group of contact transformations if and only if the Lie derivative $\mathcal{L}_{V^r}(\theta)$ of any contact form θ preserves the contact ideal.

Let us begin with the first order case. Consider a general vector field V^{1} on J^{1}(π), given by

$$V^1\ \stackrel{\mathrm{def}}{=}\ \rho^i\left(x^i, u^\alpha, u_I^\alpha\right)\frac{\partial}{\partial x^i} + \phi^{\alpha}\left(x^i, u^\alpha, u_I^\alpha\right)\frac{\partial}{\partial u^{\alpha}} + \chi^{\alpha}_i\left(x^i, u^\alpha, u_I^\alpha\right)\frac{\partial}{\partial u^{\alpha}_i}.$$

We now apply $\mathcal{L}_{V^1}$ to the basic contact forms $\theta^{\alpha}_0 = du^{\alpha} - u_i^{\alpha}dx^i,$ and expand the exterior derivative of the functions in terms of their coordinates to obtain:

$$\begin{align}
\mathcal{L}_{V^1}\left(\theta^{\alpha}_0\right)
&= \mathcal{L}_{V^1}\left(du^{\alpha} - u_i^{\alpha}dx^i\right) \\
&= \mathcal{L}_{V^1}du^{\alpha} - \left(\mathcal{L}_{V^1}u_i^{\alpha}\right)dx^i - u_i^{\alpha}\left(\mathcal{L}_{V^1}dx^i\right) \\
&= d\left(V^1u^{\alpha}\right) - V^1u_i^{\alpha}dx^i - u_i^{\alpha}d\left(V^1 x^i\right) \\
&= d\phi^{\alpha} - \chi^{\alpha}_idx^i - u_i^{\alpha}d\rho^i \\
&= \frac{\partial \phi^{\alpha}}{\partial x^i} dx^i + \frac{\partial \phi^{\alpha}}{\partial u^k} du^k + \frac{\partial \phi^{\alpha}}{\partial u^k_i} du^k_i - \chi^{\alpha}_i dx^i - u_i^{\alpha}\left[ \frac{\partial \rho^i}{\partial x^m} dx^m + \frac{\partial \rho^i}{\partial u^k} du^k + \frac{\partial \rho^i}{\partial u^k_m} du^k_m \right] \\
&= \frac{\partial \phi^{\alpha}}{\partial x^i} dx^i +
\frac{\partial \phi^{\alpha}}{\partial u^k} \left(\theta^k + u_i^k dx^i\right) +
\frac{\partial \phi^{\alpha}}{\partial u^k_i} du^k_i -
\chi^{\alpha}_i dx^i - u_l^{\alpha} \left[
\frac{\partial \rho^l}{\partial x^i} dx^i +
\frac{\partial \rho^l}{\partial u^k} \left(\theta^k + u_i^k dx^i\right) +
\frac{\partial \rho^l}{\partial u^k_i} du^k_i
\right]  \\
&= \left[
\frac{\partial \phi^{\alpha}}{\partial x^i} +
\frac{\partial \phi^{\alpha}}{\partial u^k}u_i^k -
u_l^\alpha \left(\frac{\partial \rho^l}{\partial x^i} + \frac{\partial \rho^l}{\partial u^k}u_i^k\right) -
\chi^{\alpha}_i
\right] dx^i +
\left[ \frac{\partial \phi^{\alpha}}{\partial u^k_i} - u_l^{\alpha}\frac{\partial \rho^l}{\partial u^k_i}\right] du^k_i +
\left( \frac{\partial \phi^{\alpha}}{\partial u^k} - u_l^{\alpha}\frac{\partial \rho^l}{\partial u^k} \right)\theta^k
\end{align}$$

Therefore, V^{1} determines a contact transformation if and only if the coefficients of dx^{i} and $du^k_i$ in the formula vanish. The latter requirements imply the contact conditions

$$\frac{\partial \phi^{\alpha}}{\partial u^k_i} - u^{\alpha}_l \frac{\partial \rho^l}{\partial u^k_i} = 0$$

The former requirements provide explicit formulae for the coefficients of the first derivative terms in V^{1}:

$$\chi^{\alpha}_i = \widehat{D}_i \phi^{\alpha} - u^{\alpha}_l\left(\widehat{D}_i\rho^l\right)$$

where

$$\widehat{D}_i = \frac{\partial}{\partial x^i} + u^k_i\frac{\partial}{\partial u^k}$$

denotes the zeroth order truncation of the total derivative D_{i}.

Thus, the contact conditions uniquely prescribe the prolongation of any point or contact vector field. That is, if $\mathcal{L}_{V^r}$ satisfies these equations, V^{r} is called the r-th prolongation of V to a vector field on J^{r}(π).

These results are best understood when applied to a particular example. Hence, let us examine the following.

=== Example ===
Consider the case (E, π, M), where E ≅ R^{2} and M ≃ R. Then, (J^{1}(π), π, E) defines the first jet bundle, and may be coordinated by (x, u, u_{1}), where

$$\begin{align}
x(j^1_{p}\sigma) &= x(p) = x  \\
u(j^1_{p}\sigma) &= u(\sigma(p)) = u(\sigma(x)) = \sigma(x) \\
u_1(j^1_{p}\sigma) &=  \left.\frac{\partial \sigma}{\partial x}\right|_{p} = \dot{\sigma}(x)
\end{align}$$

for all p ∈ M and σ in Γ_{p}(π). A contact form on J^{1}(π) has the form

$$\theta = du - u_1 dx$$

Consider a vector V on E, having the form

$$V = x \frac{\partial}{\partial u} - u \frac{\partial}{\partial x}$$

Then, the first prolongation of this vector field to J^{1}(π) is

$$\begin{align}
V^1 &= V + Z \\
&= x \frac{\partial}{\partial u} - u \frac{\partial}{\partial x} + Z \\
&= x \frac{\partial}{\partial u} - u \frac{\partial}{\partial x} + \rho(x, u, u_1) \frac{\partial}{\partial u_1}
\end{align}$$

If we now take the Lie derivative of the contact form with respect to this prolonged vector field, $\mathcal{L}_{V^1}(\theta),$ we obtain

$$\begin{align}
\mathcal{L}_{V^1}(\theta)
&= \mathcal{L}_{V^1}(du - u_1dx) \\
&= \mathcal{L}_{V^1}du - \left(\mathcal{L}_{V^1}u_1\right)dx - u_1\left(\mathcal{L}_{V^1}dx\right) \\
&= d\left(V^1u\right) - V^1 u_1 dx - u_1 d\left(V^1x\right) \\
&= dx - \rho(x, u, u_1)dx + u_1 du \\
&= (1 - \rho(x, u, u_1))dx + u_1 du \\
&= [1 - \rho(x, u, u_1)]dx + u_1(\theta + u_1 dx) && du = \theta + u_1 dx \\
&= [1 + u_1u_1 - \rho(x, u, u_1)]dx + u_1\theta
\end{align}$$

Hence, for preservation of the contact ideal, we require

$$1 + u_1 u_1 - \rho(x, u, u_1) = 0 \quad \Leftrightarrow \quad \rho(x, u, u_1) = 1 + u_1 u_1.$$

And so the first prolongation of V to a vector field on J^{1}(π) is

$$V^1 = x \frac{\partial}{\partial u} - u \frac{\partial}{\partial x} + (1 + u_1u_1)\frac{\partial}{\partial u_1}.$$

Let us also calculate the second prolongation of V to a vector field on J^{2}(π). We have $\{x, u, u_1, u_2\}$ as coordinates on J^{2}(π). Hence, the prolonged vector has the form

$$V^2 = x \frac{\partial}{\partial u} - u \frac{\partial}{\partial x} + \rho(x, u, u_1, u_2)\frac{\partial}{\partial u_1} + \phi(x, u, u_1, u_2)\frac{\partial}{\partial u_2}.$$

The contact forms are

$$\begin{align}
\theta &= du - u_1dx \\
\theta_1 &= du_1 - u_2dx
\end{align}$$

To preserve the contact ideal, we require

$$\begin{align}
\mathcal{L}_{V^2}(\theta) &= 0 \\
\mathcal{L}_{V^2}(\theta_1) &= 0
\end{align}$$

Now, θ has no u_{2} dependency. Hence, from this equation we will pick up the formula for ρ, which will necessarily be the same result as we found for V^{1}. Therefore, the problem is analogous to prolonging the vector field V^{1} to J^{2}(π). That is to say, we may generate the r-th prolongation of a vector field by recursively applying the Lie derivative of the contact forms with respect to the prolonged vector fields, r times. So, we have

$$\rho(x, u, u_1) = 1 + u_1 u_1$$

and so

$$\begin{align}
V^2 &= V^1 + \phi(x, u, u_1, u_2)\frac{\partial}{\partial u_2} \\
&= x \frac{\partial}{\partial u} - u \frac{\partial}{\partial x} + (1 + u_1 u_1)\frac{\partial}{\partial u_1} + \phi(x, u, u_1, u_2)\frac{\partial}{\partial u_2}
\end{align}$$

Therefore, the Lie derivative of the second contact form with respect to V^{2} is

$$\begin{align}
\mathcal{L}_{V^2}(\theta_1)
&= \mathcal{L}_{V^2}(du_1 - u_2dx) \\
&=  \mathcal{L}_{V^2}du_1 - \left(\mathcal{L}_{V^2}u_2\right)dx - u_2\left(\mathcal{L}_{V^2}dx\right) \\
&= d(V^2 u_1) - V^2u_2dx - u_2d(V^2x) \\
&= d(1 + u_1 u_1) - \phi(x, u, u_1, u_2)dx + u_2du \\
&= 2u_1du_1 - \phi(x, u, u_1, u_2)dx + u_2du \\
&= 2u_1du_1 - \phi(x, u, u_1, u_2)dx + u_2 (\theta + u_1dx)              &   du &= \theta + u_1 dx \\
&= 2u_1(\theta_1 + u_2dx) - \phi(x, u, u_1, u_2)dx + u_2(\theta + u_1dx) & du_1 &= \theta_1 + u_2 dx \\
&= [3u_1u_2 - \phi(x, u, u_1, u_2)]dx + u_2\theta + 2u_1\theta_1
\end{align}$$

Hence, for $\mathcal{L}_{V^2}(\theta_1)$ to preserve the contact ideal, we require

$$3u_1 u_2 - \phi(x, u, u_1, u_2) = 0 \quad \Leftrightarrow \quad \phi(x, u, u_1, u_2) = 3u_1 u_2.$$

And so the second prolongation of V to a vector field on J^{2}(π) is

$$V^2 = x \frac{\partial}{\partial u} - u \frac{\partial}{\partial x} + (1 + u_1 u_1)\frac{\partial}{\partial u_1} + 3u_1 u_2\frac{\partial}{\partial u_2}.$$

Note that the first prolongation of V can be recovered by omitting the second derivative terms in V^{2}, or by projecting back to J^{1}(π).

== Infinite jet spaces ==
The inverse limit of the sequence of projections $\pi_{k+1,k}:J^{k+1}(\pi)\to J^k(\pi)$ gives rise to the infinite jet space J^{∞}(π). A point $j_p^\infty(\sigma)$ is the equivalence class of sections of π that have the same k-jet in p as σ for all values of k. The natural projection π_{∞} maps $j_p^\infty(\sigma)$ into p.

Just by thinking in terms of coordinates, J^{∞}(π) appears to be an infinite-dimensional geometric object. In fact, the simplest way of introducing a differentiable structure on J^{∞}(π), not relying on differentiable charts, is given by the differential calculus over commutative algebras. Dual to the sequence of projections $\pi_{k+1,k}: J^{k+1}(\pi) \to J^k(\pi)$ of manifolds is the sequence of injections $\pi_{k+1,k}^*: C^\infty(J^{k}(\pi)) \to C^\infty\left(J^{k+1}(\pi)\right)$ of commutative algebras. Let's denote $C^\infty(J^{k}(\pi))$ simply by $\mathcal{F}_k(\pi)$. Take now the direct limit $\mathcal{F}(\pi)$ of the $\mathcal{F}_k(\pi)$'s. It will be a commutative algebra, which can be assumed to be the smooth functions algebra over the geometric object J^{∞}(π). Observe that $\mathcal{F}(\pi)$, being born as a direct limit, carries an additional structure: it is a filtered commutative algebra.

Roughly speaking, a concrete element $\varphi\in\mathcal{F}(\pi)$ will always belong to some $\mathcal{F}_k(\pi)$, so it is a smooth function on the finite-dimensional manifold J^{k}(π) in the usual sense.

=== Infinitely prolonged PDEs ===
Given a k-th order system of PDEs E ⊆ J^{k}(π), the collection I(E) of vanishing on E smooth functions on J^{∞}(π) is an ideal in the algebra $\mathcal{F}_k(\pi)$, and hence in the direct limit $\mathcal{F}(\pi)$ too.

Enhance I(E) by adding all the possible compositions of total derivatives applied to all its elements. This way we get a new ideal I of $\mathcal{F}(\pi)$ which is now closed under the operation of taking total derivative. The submanifold E_{(∞)} of J^{∞}(π) cut out by I is called the infinite prolongation of E.

Geometrically, E_{(∞)} is the manifold of formal solutions of E. A point $j_p^\infty(\sigma)$ of E_{(∞)} can be easily seen to be represented by a section σ whose k-jet's graph is tangent to E at the point $j_p^k(\sigma)$ with arbitrarily high order of tangency.

Analytically, if E is given by φ = 0, a formal solution can be understood as the set of Taylor coefficients of a section σ in a point p that make vanish the Taylor series of $\varphi\circ j^k(\sigma)$ at the point p.

Most importantly, the closure properties of I imply that E_{(∞)} is tangent to the infinite-order contact structure $\mathcal{C}$ on J^{∞}(π), so that by restricting $\mathcal{C}$ to E_{(∞)} one gets the diffiety $(E_{(\infty)}, \mathcal{C}|_{E_{(\infty)}})$, and can study the associated Vinogradov (C-spectral) sequence.

== Remark ==
This article has defined jets of local sections of a bundle, but it is possible to define jets of functions f: M → N, where M and N are manifolds; the jet of f then just corresponds to the jet of the section

gr_{f}: M → M × N
gr_{f}(p) = (p, f(p))

(gr_{f} is known as the graph of the function f) of the trivial bundle (M × N, π_{1}, M). However, this restriction does not simplify the theory, as the global triviality of π does not imply the global triviality of π_{1}.

== See also ==
- Jet group
- Jet (mathematics)
- Lagrangian system
- Variational bicomplex
