= Landau prime ideal theorem =

Provides an asymptotic formula for counting the number of prime ideals of a number field

In algebraic number theory, the prime ideal theorem is the number field generalization of the prime number theorem. It provides an asymptotic formula for counting the number of prime ideals of a number field K, with norm at most X.

== Example ==
What to expect can be seen already for the Gaussian integers. There for any prime number p of the form 4n + 1, p factors as a product of two Gaussian primes of norm p. Primes of the form 4n + 3 remain prime, giving a Gaussian prime of norm p^{2}. Therefore, we should estimate

$$2r(X)+r^\prime(\sqrt{X})$$

where r counts primes in the arithmetic progression 4n + 1, and r′ in the arithmetic progression 4n + 3. By the quantitative form of Dirichlet's theorem on primes, each of r(Y) and r′(Y) is asymptotically

$$\frac{Y}{2\log Y}.$$

Therefore, the 2r(X) term dominates, and is asymptotically

$$\frac{X}{\log X}.$$

== General number fields ==
This general pattern holds for number fields in general, so that the prime ideal theorem is dominated by the ideals of norm a prime number. As Edmund Landau proved in Landau 1903, for norm at most X the same asymptotic formula

$$\frac{X}{\log X}$$

always holds. Heuristically this is because the logarithmic derivative of the Dedekind zeta-function of K always has a simple pole with residue −1 at s = 1.

As with the Prime Number Theorem, a more precise estimate may be given in terms of the logarithmic integral function. The number of prime ideals of norm ≤ X is

$$\mathrm{Li}(X) + O_K(X \exp(-c_K \sqrt{\log(X)})), \,$$

where c_{K} is a constant depending on K.

== See also ==
- Abstract analytic number theory
