= Anton Smagin =

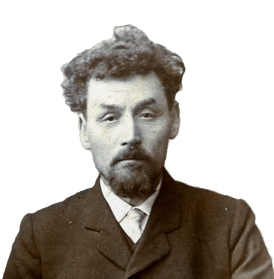

Deputy of the State Duma (Russian Empire)
- In office February 20, 1907 – 3 June 1907

Personal details
- Born: Anton Zinovevich Smagin; July 29, 1859 the village of Grigoryevskaya
- Died: December 1932 (aged 72–73)

Anton Zinovevich Smagin (Russian: Анто́н Зино́вьевич Сма́гин; born 29 July 1859) was a farmer and merchant, a member of the Constitutional-democratic party since its Foundation to prohibit, Deputy of the State Duma (Russian Empire) of the II convocation from the Constitutional-democratic party.

== Biography ==
Anton Zinovievich Smagin was born in a prosperous, by village standards, family in the village of Grigoryevskoye, Zaraysk district, Ryazan province. He learned a letter from a village clerk and became an avid book reader. In 1898, he achieved the opening of a library in the village - the first rural public library in the Ryazan province. In 1900, he was the first in the province to start selling books in the countryside.

He became a member of the Constitutional Democratic Party (Cadets) at the time of its foundation. From this party, he was elected deputy of the State Duma of the Russian Empire of the second convocation, and it was he who was entrusted with the first of the cadets to speak at the first plenary meeting of the duma of this convocation. His speech was devoted to amnesty. Smagin's public and elective activity was not limited to deputy in the Second Duma, he was constantly elected as a vowel of the Zaraysk district zemstvo assembly, and his zemstvo activity ceased only when the Bolsheviks came to power.

In November 1918, mass peasant protests against the Bolsheviks took place throughout the Ryazan province. In Grigoryevsky, the youngest son of Smagin, Ivan, the ensign of the tsarist army, was chosen as the military leader of the uprising. After the suppression of unrest, Ivan fled, and A. Z. Smagin himself was arrested in his place and placed under the name of his son in a Zaraisk prison, where he spent about two months. He was arrested a second time and also briefly in January 1920.

In the fall of 1929, the peasants of Grigoryevsky at rural gatherings refused the contracts for the supply of grain proposed by the district authorities and halved their self-imposed plans. This was seen as the machinations of enemies and counter-revolutionary agitation, the OGPU arrested 9 people, among whom were Smagin with his son Mikhail and priest V. I. Tumin. Smagin ended up in the Solovetsky counterattack camp, where he died no later than April 7, 1933. The place and circumstances of death are unknown.

== Literature ==
- Bojovic M. M. "Members of the State Duma (Portraits and biographies). The second convocation@, M, 1907. P. 279.
- The State Duma of the Russian Empire: 1906-1917. B. Yu. Ivanov, A. A. Komzolova, I. S. Ryakhovsky. Moscow. ROSSPEN. 2008. P. 564.
- Russian state historical archive. Fund 1278. List 1 (2nd convocation). Case 395; Case 566. Sheet 8.
- Anton Z. Smagin
