= Divine Proportions: Rational Trigonometry to Universal Geometry =

2005 book reformulating plane geometry

- Author: Norman J. Wildberger
- Genre: Mathematics
- Publisher: Wild Egg
- Publication date: 2005

Divine Proportions: Rational Trigonometry to Universal Geometry is a 2005 book by the mathematician Norman J. Wildberger on a proposed alternative approach to Euclidean geometry and trigonometry, called rational trigonometry. The book advocates replacing the usual basic quantities of trigonometry, Euclidean distance and angle measure, by squared distance and the square of the sine of the angle, respectively. This is logically equivalent to the standard development (as the replacement quantities can be expressed in terms of the standard ones and vice versa). The author claims his approach holds some advantages, such as avoiding the need for irrational numbers.

The book was "essentially self-published" by Wildberger through his publishing company Wild Egg. The formulas and theorems in the book are regarded as correct mathematics but the claims about practical or pedagogical superiority are primarily promoted by Wildberger himself and have received mixed reviews.

== Overview ==
The main idea of Divine Proportions is to replace distances by the squared Euclidean distance, which Wildberger calls the quadrance, and to replace angle measures by the squares of their sines, which Wildberger calls the spread between two lines. Divine Proportions defines both of these concepts directly from the Cartesian coordinates of points that determine a line segment or a pair of crossing lines. Defined in this way, they are rational functions of those coordinates, and can be calculated directly without the need to take the square roots or inverse trigonometric functions required when computing distances or angle measures.

For Wildberger, a finitist, this replacement has the purported advantage of avoiding the concepts of limits and actual infinity used in defining the real numbers, which Wildberger claims to be unfounded. It also allows analogous concepts to be extended directly from the rational numbers to other number systems such as finite fields using the same formulas for quadrance and spread. Additionally, this method avoids the ambiguity of the two supplementary angles formed by a pair of lines, as both angles have the same spread. This system is claimed to be more intuitive, and to extend more easily from two to three dimensions. However, in exchange for these benefits, one loses the additivity of distances and angles: for instance, if a line segment is divided in two, its length is the sum of the lengths of the two pieces, but combining the quadrances of the pieces is more complicated and requires square roots.

== Organization and topics ==
Divine Proportions is divided into four parts. Part I presents an overview of the use of quadrance and spread to replace distance and angle, and makes the argument for their advantages. Part II formalizes the claims made in part I, and proves them rigorously. Rather than defining lines as infinite sets of points, they are defined by their homogeneous coordinates, which may be used in formulas for testing the incidence of points and lines. Like the sine, the cosine and tangent are replaced with rational equivalents, called the "cross" and "twist", and Divine Proportions develops various analogues of trigonometric identities involving these quantities, including versions of the Pythagorean theorem, law of sines and law of cosines.

Part III develops the geometry of triangles and conic sections using the tools developed in the two previous parts. Well known results such as Heron's formula for calculating the area of a triangle from its side lengths, or the inscribed angle theorem in the form that the angles subtended by a chord of a circle from other points on the circle are equal, are reformulated in terms of quadrance and spread, and thereby generalized to arbitrary fields of numbers. Finally, Part IV considers practical applications in physics and surveying, and develops extensions to higher-dimensional Euclidean space and to polar coordinates.

== Audience ==
Divine Proportions does not assume much in the way of mathematical background in its readers, but its many long formulas, frequent consideration of finite fields, and (after part I) emphasis on mathematical rigour are likely to be obstacles to a popular mathematics audience. Instead, it is mainly written for mathematics teachers and researchers. However, it may also be readable by mathematics students, and contains exercises making it possible to use as the basis for a mathematics course.

== Critical reception ==
The feature of the book that was most positively received by reviewers was its work extending results in distance and angle geometry to finite fields. Reviewer Laura Wiswell found this work impressive, and was charmed by the result that the smallest finite field containing a regular pentagon is $\mathbb{F}_{19}$. Michael Henle calls the extension of triangle and conic section geometry to finite fields, in part III of the book, "an elegant theory of great generality", and William Barker also writes approvingly of this aspect of the book, calling it "particularly novel" and possibly opening up new research directions.

Wiswell raises the question of how many of the detailed results presented without attribution in this work are actually novel. In this light, Michael Henle notes that the use of squared Euclidean distance "has often been found convenient elsewhere"; for instance it is used in distance geometry, least squares statistics, and convex optimization. James Franklin points out that for spaces of three or more dimensions, modelled conventionally using linear algebra, the use of spread by Divine Proportions is not very different from standard methods involving dot products in place of trigonometric functions.

An advantage of Wildberger's methods noted by Henle is that, because they involve only simple algebra, the proofs are both easy to follow and easy for a computer to verify. However, he suggests that the book's claims of greater simplicity in its overall theory rest on a false comparison in which quadrance and spread are weighed not against the corresponding classical concepts of distances, angles, and sines, but the much wider set of tools from classical trigonometry. He also points out that, to a student with a scientific calculator, formulas that avoid square roots and trigonometric functions are a non-issue, and Barker adds that the new formulas often involve a greater number of individual calculation steps. Although multiple reviewers felt that a reduction in the amount of time needed to teach students trigonometry would be very welcome, Paul Campbell is skeptical that these methods would actually speed learning. Gerry Leversha keeps an open mind, writing that "It will be interesting to see some of the textbooks aimed at school pupils [that Wildberger] has promised to produce, and ... controlled experiments involving student guinea pigs." However, these textbooks and experiments have not been published.

Wiswell is unconvinced by the claim that conventional geometry has foundational flaws that these methods avoid. While agreeing with Wiswell, Barker points out that there may be other mathematicians who share Wildberger's philosophical suspicions of the infinite, and that this work should be of great interest to them.

A final issue raised by multiple reviewers is inertia: supposing for the sake of argument that these methods are better, they ask whether they are sufficiently better to make worthwhile the large individual effort of re-learning geometry and trigonometry in these terms, and the institutional effort of re-working the school curriculum to use them in place of classical geometry and trigonometry. Henle, Barker, and Leversha conclude that the book has not made its case for this, but Sandra Arlinghaus sees this work as an opportunity for fields such as her mathematical geography "that have relatively little invested in traditional institutional rigidity" to demonstrate the promise of such a replacement.

== See also ==
- Perles configuration, a finite set of points and lines in the Euclidean plane that cannot be represented with rational coordinates
