= Differential calculus over commutative algebras =

In mathematics, differential calculus over commutative algebras is a part of commutative algebra based on the observation that most concepts known from classical differential calculus can be formulated in purely algebraic terms. Instances of this are:

1. The whole topological information of a smooth manifold $M$ is encoded in the algebraic properties of its $\R$-algebra of smooth functions $A = C^\infty (M),$ as in the Banach–Stone theorem.
2. Vector bundles over $M$ correspond to projective finitely generated modules over $A,$ via the functor $\Gamma$ which associates to a vector bundle its module of sections.
3. Vector fields on $M$ are naturally identified with derivations of the algebra $A$.
4. More generally, a linear differential operator of order k, sending sections of a vector bundle $E\rightarrow M$ to sections of another bundle $F \rightarrow M$ is seen to be an $\R$-linear map $\Delta : \Gamma (E) \to \Gamma (F)$ between the associated modules, such that for any $k + 1$ elements $f_0, \ldots, f_k \in A$:

$$\left[f_k \left[f_{k-1} \left[\cdots\left[f_0, \Delta\right] \cdots \right]\right]\right] = 0$$
where the bracket $[f, \Delta] : \Gamma(E)\to \Gamma(F)$ is defined as the commutator
$$[f,\Delta](s) = \Delta(f \cdot s) - f \cdot \Delta(s).$$

Denoting the set of $k$^{th} order linear differential operators from an $A$-module $P$ to an $A$-module $Q$ with $\mathrm{Diff}_k(P, Q)$ we obtain a bi-functor with values in the category of $A$-modules. Other natural concepts of calculus such as jet spaces, differential forms are then obtained as representing objects of the functors $\mathrm{Diff}_k$ and related functors.

Seen from this point of view calculus may in fact be understood as the theory of these functors and their representing objects.

Replacing the real numbers $\R$ with any commutative ring, and the algebra $C^\infty(M)$ with any commutative algebra the above said remains meaningful, hence differential calculus can be developed for arbitrary commutative algebras. Many of these concepts are widely used in algebraic geometry, differential geometry and secondary calculus. Moreover, the theory generalizes naturally to the setting of graded commutative algebra, allowing for a natural foundation of calculus on supermanifolds, graded manifolds and associated concepts like the Berezin integral.

== See also ==
- Secondary calculus and cohomological physics – Modern discipline
- Differential algebra – Algebraic study of differential equations
- Spectrum of a ring – Set of a ring's prime ideals
