= Differential algebraic geometry =

Differential algebraic geometry is an area of differential algebra that adapts concepts and methods from algebraic geometry and applies them to systems of differential equations, especially algebraic differential equations.

Another way of generalizing ideas from algebraic geometry is diffiety theory.
