= Function theory =

Function theory may refer to:

- Theory of functions of a real variable, the traditional name of real analysis, a branch of mathematical analysis dealing with the real numbers and real-valued functions of a real variable
- Theory of functions of a complex variable, the historical name for complex analysis, the branch of mathematical analysis that investigates functions of complex numbers
- Constructive function theory, the study of the connection between the smoothness of a function and its degree of approximation
- Geometric function theory, the study of geometric properties of analytic functions
