= Nevanlinna =

Nevanlinna may refer to:

- Nyenskans, a Swedish fortress on the river Neva from 1617 to 1703, at the location of today's Saint Petersburg
- Frithiof Nevanlinna, a Finnish mathematician
- Rolf Nevanlinna, a Finnish mathematician

- Nevanlinna class, a class of mathematical functions, otherwise known as bounded type
- Nevanlinna invariant, a geometrical invariant
- Nevanlinna theory, a branch of complex analysis developed by Rolf Nevanlinna
- The Nevanlinna Prize
