= Oswald Teichmüller =

German mathematician (1913–1943)

- Born: Paul Julius Oswald Teichmüller; 18 June 1913; Nordhausen, Province of Saxony, Prussia, German Empire
- Died: 11 September 1943 (aged 30); Poltava, Ukrainian SSR, Soviet Union
- Education: University of Göttingen (Ph.D.)
- Known for: Teichmüller character Teichmüller cocycle Teichmüller space Teichmüller–Tukey lemma p-basis
- Scientific career
- Fields: Mathematics
- Institutions: University of Berlin
- Thesis: Operatoren im Wachsschen Raum (1936)
- Doctoral advisor: Helmut Hasse

Paul Julius Oswald Teichmüller (German: [ˈɔsvalt ˈtaɪçmʏlɐ]; 18 June 1913 – 11 September 1943) was a German mathematician. He made contributions to complex analysis, including the introduction of quasiconformal mappings and differential geometric methods into the study of Riemann surfaces. The Teichmüller space is named after him, as is the Teichmüller character and the Teichmüller cocycle.

Born in Nordhausen, Teichmüller attended the University of Göttingen, where he graduated in 1935 under the supervision of Helmut Hasse. His doctoral dissertation was on operator theory, though this was his only work on functional analysis. His next few papers were algebraic, but he switched his focus to complex analysis after attending lectures given by Rolf Nevanlinna. In 1937, he moved to the University of Berlin to work with Ludwig Bieberbach. Bieberbach was the editor of Deutsche Mathematik and much of Teichmüller's work was published in the journal, which made his papers hard to find in modern libraries before the release of his collected works.

A member of the Nazi Party (NSDAP) and Sturmabteilung (SA), the military wing of the NSDAP, from 1931, Teichmüller agitated against his Jewish professors Richard Courant and Edmund Landau in 1933. He was drafted into the Wehrmacht in July 1939 and took part in the invasion of Norway in 1940 before being recalled to Berlin to undertake cryptographic work with the Cipher Department of the High Command of the Wehrmacht. In 1942, he was released from his military duties and returned to teach at the University of Berlin. After the German defeat at Stalingrad in February 1943, he gave up his position in Berlin to volunteer for combat on the Eastern Front. He disappeared in unknown circumstances in September 1943.

Sanford L. Segal, a professor of mathematics at the University of Rochester, in his 2003 book Mathematicians Under the Nazis said: "Teichmüller was a gifted, brilliant, and seminal mathematician; he was also a dedicated Nazi."

== Biography ==
=== Early life ===
Paul Julius Oswald Teichmüller was born in 1913 in Nordhausen, and grew up in Sankt Andreasberg. His parents were Gertrude (née Dinse) and Adolf Julius Paul Teichmüller. At the time of Oswald's birth, his father–an independent weaver by profession–was 33, and his mother was 39; they had no further children. His father was injured during World War I and died when Oswald was 12. According to Gertrude, when Oswald was three she discovered that he knew how to count and had learned to read on his own. After his father's death, she took him out of his school in Sankt Andreasberg which "he had long outgrown" and sent him to live with his aunt in Nordhausen, where he attended the Gymnasium.

=== Education ===
Teichmüller received his Abitur in 1931, and enrolled at the University of Göttingen as a "brilliant but lonely student from the hinterlands." Hans Lewy, a young instructor at Göttingen at the time, later told anecdotes of the ungainly Teichmüller's brilliance. Among Teichmüller's professors were Richard Courant, Gustav Herglotz, Edmund Landau, Otto Neugebauer and Hermann Weyl. He also joined the NSDAP in July 1931 and became a member of the Sturmabteilung in August 1931. On 2 November 1933 he organised the boycott of his Jewish professor Edmund Landau; in 1994, Friedrich L. Bauer described Teichmüller as a "genius" but a "fanatic Nazi" who "stood out with his agitation against Landau and Courant." Teichmüller later met Landau in his office to discuss the boycott, and penned a letter, at Landau's request, regarding his motivation:

I am not concerned with making difficulties for you as a Jew, but only with protecting – above all – German students of the second semester from being taught differential and integral calculus by a teacher of a race quite foreign to them. I, like everyone else, do not doubt your ability to instruct suitable students of whatever origin in the purely abstract aspects of mathematics. But I know that many academic courses, especially the differential and integral calculus, have at the same time educative value, inducting the pupil not only to a conceptual world but also to a different frame of mind. But since the latter depends very substantially on the racial composition of the individual, it follows that a German student should not be allowed to be trained by a Jewish teacher.

In 1934, Teichmüller wrote a draft dissertation on operator theory, which he titled Operatoren im Wachsschen Raum. The draft related to lectures he had received from Franz Rellich, but he did not bring his dissertation proposal to Rellich due to the fact Rellich was previously the assistant to the Jewish professor Richard Courant who fled Germany in 1933. Teichmüller instead brought it to Helmut Hasse. Operator theory was not in Hasse's area of expertise, so he sent it to Gottfried Köthe. Köthe's comments helped Teichmüller polish the dissertation, and Teichmüller submitted it for review on 10 June 1935 to his examining committee which consisted of Hasse, Herglotz and the Göttingen physicist Robert Pohl. Teichmüller passed his doctoral exam on 28 June 1935 and was officially awarded his Ph.D. in mathematics in November 1935.

=== Academic career ===
After Teichmüller passed his doctoral exam in June 1935, Hasse petitioned for the university to appoint Teichmüller as an assistant professor in the mathematical department. In his letter he stated Teichmüller had "extraordinary mathematical gifts" and that his teaching style was "painfully exact, in high degree suggestive, and impressive sort." Teichmüller received the position and began to devote himself more to mathematics at the expense of politics, which led fellow NSDAP members to describe him as "eccentric".

Teichmüller's doctoral dissertation was his only work on functional analysis, and his next few papers were algebraic, showing the influence Hasse had on him. In late 1936, he began to work on his habilitation thesis so that he could move to the University of Berlin to work with Ludwig Bieberbach, an outstanding mathematician, staunch supporter of the NSDAP and the editor of Deutsche Mathematik. Teichmüller's habilitation thesis, Untersuchungen über konforme und quasikonforme Abbildungen, was not influenced by Hasse, but by the lectures of Rolf Nevanlinna, who was a visiting professor at the University of Göttingen. Under the influence of Nevanlinna, Teichmüller moved away from algebra and developed an interest in complex analysis. He made four contributions to Deutsche Mathematik in 1936, three of them algebraic, but thereafter he published just one algebraic paper.

Teichmüller moved to Berlin in April 1937, and habilitated at the University of Berlin in March 1938. In Berlin with Bieberbach, Teichmüller had someone who shared his political views and who was also an exceptional mathematician, which led to two years of great productivity. Between April 1937 and July 1939, Teichmüller published seven papers in addition to his 197-page monograph on "extremal quasiconformal mappings and quadratic differentials," which laid the basis for the theory of the Teichmüller space.

=== World War II ===
On 18 July 1939, Teichmüller was drafted into the Wehrmacht. He was originally intended to do only eight weeks' training but World War II broke out before the eight weeks were up so he remained in the army and took part in Operation Weserübung in April 1940. Afterwards, he was recalled to Berlin where he became involved in cryptographic work along with other mathematicians such as Ernst Witt, Georg Aumann, Alexander Aigner and Wolfgang Franz in the Cipher Department of the High Command of the Wehrmacht.

In 1941, Bieberbach requested that Teichmüller be released from his military duties in order to continue teaching at the University of Berlin. This request was granted and he was able to teach at the university from 1942 to early 1943. After the German defeat at Stalingrad in February 1943, however, Teichmüller left his position in Berlin and volunteered for combat on the Eastern Front, entering a unit which became involved in the Battle of Kursk. In the beginning of August, he received furlough when his unit reached Kharkiv. His unit was surrounded by Soviet troops and largely wiped out by late August, but in early September he attempted to rejoin them. He is reported to have reached somewhere east of the Dnieper but west of Kharkiv (most likely Poltava), where he disappeared in unknown circumstances on 11 September 1943.

== Mathematical works ==
In his career, Teichmüller wrote 34 papers in the space of around 6 years. His early algebraic investigations dealt with the valuation theory of fields and the structure of algebras. In valuation theory, he introduced multiplicative systems of representatives of the residue field of valuation rings, which led to a characterisation of the structure of the whole field in terms of the residue field. In the theory of algebras, he started to generalise Emmy Noether's concept of crossed products from fields to certain kind of algebras, gaining new insights into the structure of p-algebras. Although from 1937 on his main interests shifted to geometric function theory, Teichmüller did not give up algebra; in a paper published in 1940, he explored further steps toward a Galois theory of algebras, resulting in the introduction of a group that was later recognised as a third Galois cohomology group.

After his habilitation in 1938, Teichmüller turned to questions in the variation of conformal structures on surfaces, raised earlier by Bernhard Riemann, Henri Poincaré, Felix Klein, and Robert Fricke. His most important innovation was the introduction of quasiconformal mappings to the field, using ideas first developed by Herbert Grötzsch and Lars Ahlfors in different contexts. Teichmüller's main conjecture stated that variation of conformal structure can be realised uniquely by extremal quasiconformal mappings. Teichmüller also established a connection between extremal quasiconformal mappings and regular quadratic differentials using a class of related reciprocal Beltrami differentials, which led him to another conjecture proclaiming the existence of a bicontinuous bijective correspondence Φ between a space T1, of real parts of certain reciprocal Beltrami differentials and Mg, n the moduli space of all conformal structures considered. In fact, he proved the existence and injectivity of Φ.

Teichmüller also showed the existence of extremal quasiconformal mappings in the special case of certain simply connected plane regions. He then gave an existence proof for surface of type (g, 0) by a continuity argument from the uniformisation theorem and Finsler metrics. This was also intended as a first step toward a deeper investigation of moduli spaces; in one of his last papers he sketched an idea of how to endow moduli spaces with an analytic structure and how to construct an analytic fiber space of Riemann surfaces. Due to his early death, Teichmüller could not fully work out most of his ideas. However, they became seminal for later work by other mathematicians.

In 1984, Swiss mathematician Kurt Strebel gave an overview of Lars Ahlfors and Frederick Gehring's 1982 work Oswald Teichmüller: Gesammelte Abhandlungen:

In 1936 Teichmüller published five papers about various algebraic topics, and three more in 1937. But it was already in that same year that two papers in function theory appeared, one on value distribution and the other on the type problem, using quasiconformal mappings. He was already an expert in the Nevanlinna theory and evidently greatly influenced by Ahlfors' contributions to it.

Teichmüller's habilitation thesis: Untersuchungen über konforme und quasikonforme Abbildungen ("Studies of conformal and quasiconformal mappings"), which appeared in 1938, and the next paper: Ungleichungen zwischen den Koeffizienten schlichter Funktionen ("Inequalities between the coefficients of simple functions") can be considered as the beginning of his great contributions to function theory, which culminated in his masterpiece: Extremale quasikonforme Abbildungen und quadratische Differentiale ("Extremal quasiconformal mappings and quadratic differentials") (1939). In this monograph and its complement: Bestimmung der extremalen quasikonformen Abbildungen bei geschlossenen orientierten Riemannschen Flächen ("Determination of extremal quasiconformal mappings with closed oriented Riemann surfaces") (1943), Teichmüller laid the basis of what is now known as the theory of Teichmüller spaces. He further developed the theme in one of his last papers: Veränderliche Riemannsche Flächen ("Variable Riemann surfaces") (1944).

There are other things, like the extremal mappings of the pentagon (1941) or the Verschiebungssatz ("The displacement law") where he shows with great mastery how to deal with special problems. Some other papers on pure function theory, like Eine Verschärfung des Dreikreisesatzes ("A tightening of the three circles theorem"), and on algebraic functions, round out the picture.

From 2007 to 2020, the European Mathematical Society published seven volumes of the Handbook of Teichmüller Theory. The volumes contain English translations of Teichmüller's papers on complex analysis and on the field called Teichmüller theory. The volumes are edited by University of Strasbourg professor Athanase Papadopoulos.

== Publications ==
- Teichmüller, Oswald (1982), Ahlfors, Lars V.; Gehring, Frederick W. (eds.), Gesammelte Abhandlungen, Berlin, New York: Springer-Verlag, ISBN 978-3-540-10899-3
- Teichmüller, Oswald (2007), Papadopoulos, Athanase (ed.), Handbook of Teichmüller Theory. Volume I, IRMA Lectures in Mathematics and Theoretical Physics, vol. 11, Zürich: European Mathematical Society, ISBN 978-3-03719-029-6
- Teichmüller, Oswald (2009), Papadopoulos, Athanase (ed.), Handbook of Teichmüller Theory. Volume II, IRMA Lectures in Mathematics and Theoretical Physics, vol. 13, Zürich: European Mathematical Society, ISBN 978-3-03719-055-5
- Teichmüller, Oswald (2012), Papadopoulos, Athanase (ed.), Handbook of Teichmüller Theory. Volume III, IRMA Lectures in Mathematics and Theoretical Physics, vol. 17, Zürich: European Mathematical Society, ISBN 978-3-03719-103-3
- Teichmüller, Oswald (2014), Papadopoulos, Athanase (ed.), Handbook of Teichmüller Theory. Volume IV, IRMA Lectures in Mathematics and Theoretical Physics, vol. 19, Zürich: European Mathematical Society, ISBN 978-3-03719-117-0
- Teichmüller, Oswald (2016), Papadopoulos, Athanase (ed.), Handbook of Teichmüller Theory. Volume V, IRMA Lectures in Mathematics and Theoretical Physics, vol. 26, Zürich: European Mathematical Society, ISBN 978-3-03719-160-6
- Teichmüller, Oswald (2016), Papadopoulos, Athanase (ed.), Handbook of Teichmüller Theory. Volume VI, IRMA Lectures in Mathematics and Theoretical Physics, vol. 27, Zürich: European Mathematical Society, ISBN 978-3-03719-161-3
- Teichmüller, Oswald (2020), Papadopoulos, Athanase (ed.), Handbook of Teichmüller Theory. Volume VII, IRMA Lectures in Mathematics and Theoretical Physics, vol. 30, Berlin: European Mathematical Society, ISBN 978-3-03719-203-0

== See also ==
- Grothendieck–Teichmüller group
- Inter-universal Teichmüller theory
- p-adic Teichmüller theory
- Universal Teichmüller space
