= Walter Hayman =

British mathematician (1926–2020)

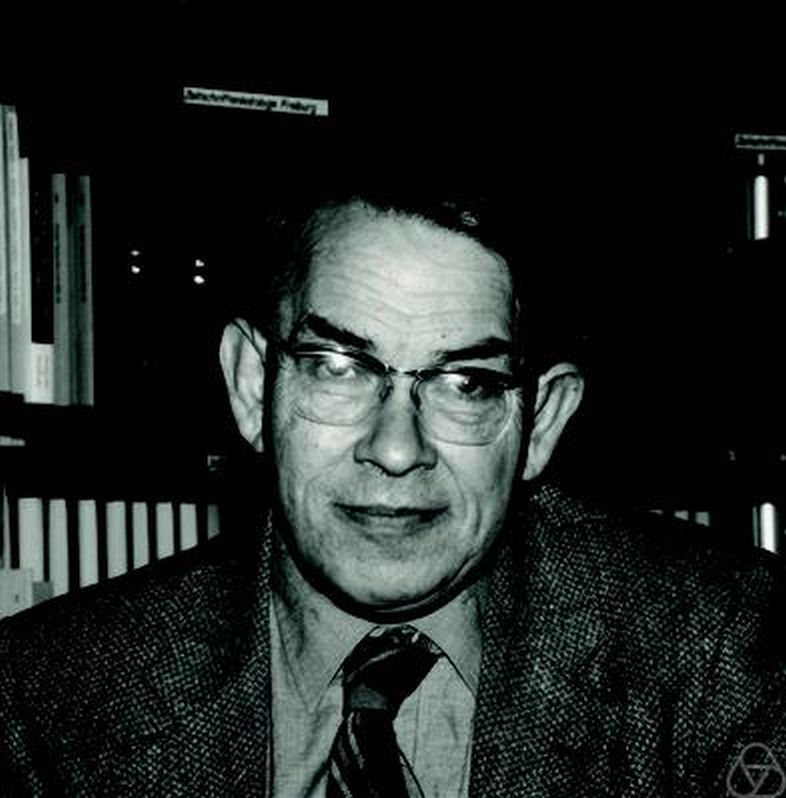
- Born: Walter Kurt Haymann; 6 January 1926; Cologne, Germany
- Died: 1 January 2020 (aged 93)
- Education: University of Cambridge
- Known for: Theory of subharmonic functions Univalent function theory
- Spouse: Margaret Hayman (née Crann)
- Awards: Berwick Prize (1955); Senior Berwick Prize (1964); De Morgan Medal (1995)
- Scientific career
- Fields: Complex analysis
- Workplaces: King's College, Newcastle; University of Exeter; Imperial College
- Website: www3.imperial.ac.uk/people/w.hayman

Walter Kurt Hayman FRS (formerly Haymann; 6 January 1926 – 1 January 2020) was a British mathematician known for contributions to complex analysis. He was a professor at Imperial College London.

== Life and work ==
Hayman was born in Cologne, Germany, the son of Roman law professor Franz Haymann (1874–1947) and Ruth Therese Hensel, daughter of mathematician Kurt Hensel. He was a great-great-grandson of acclaimed composer Fanny Mendelssohn. Because of his Jewish heritage, he left Germany, then under Nazi rule, alone by train in 1938. He continued his schooling at Gordonstoun School, and later at St John's College, Cambridge under John Edensor Littlewood and his doctoral advisor Mary Cartwright. He taught at King's College, Newcastle, and the University of Exeter.

In 1947, he married Margaret Riley Crann after they met at a Quaker meeting. Together, they founded the British Mathematical Olympiad. The pair had three daughters, including the peace activist Carolyn Hayman and the filmmaker Sheila Hayman.

He is known for his asymptotic results in Bieberbach conjecture in 1955, and for Hayman's alternatives in Nevanlinna Theory. His work with Wolfgang Fuchs gave a solution to an inverse problem of the Nevanlinna theory for entire functions, predating David Drasin's 1976 work.

== Honours and awards ==
Hayman was elected to the Royal Society in 1956 and of the Finnish Academy of Science and Letters in 1978: he was elected "Foreign member" of the Accademia dei Lincei on 16 December 1985. In 1992 he received an honorary doctorate from the Faculty of Mathematics and Science at Uppsala University, Sweden In 1995 he was awarded the De Morgan Medal by the London Mathematical Society. In 2008, an issue of the Journal Computational Methods and Function Theory was dedicated to him on the occasion of his 80th birthday.

== Selected publications ==
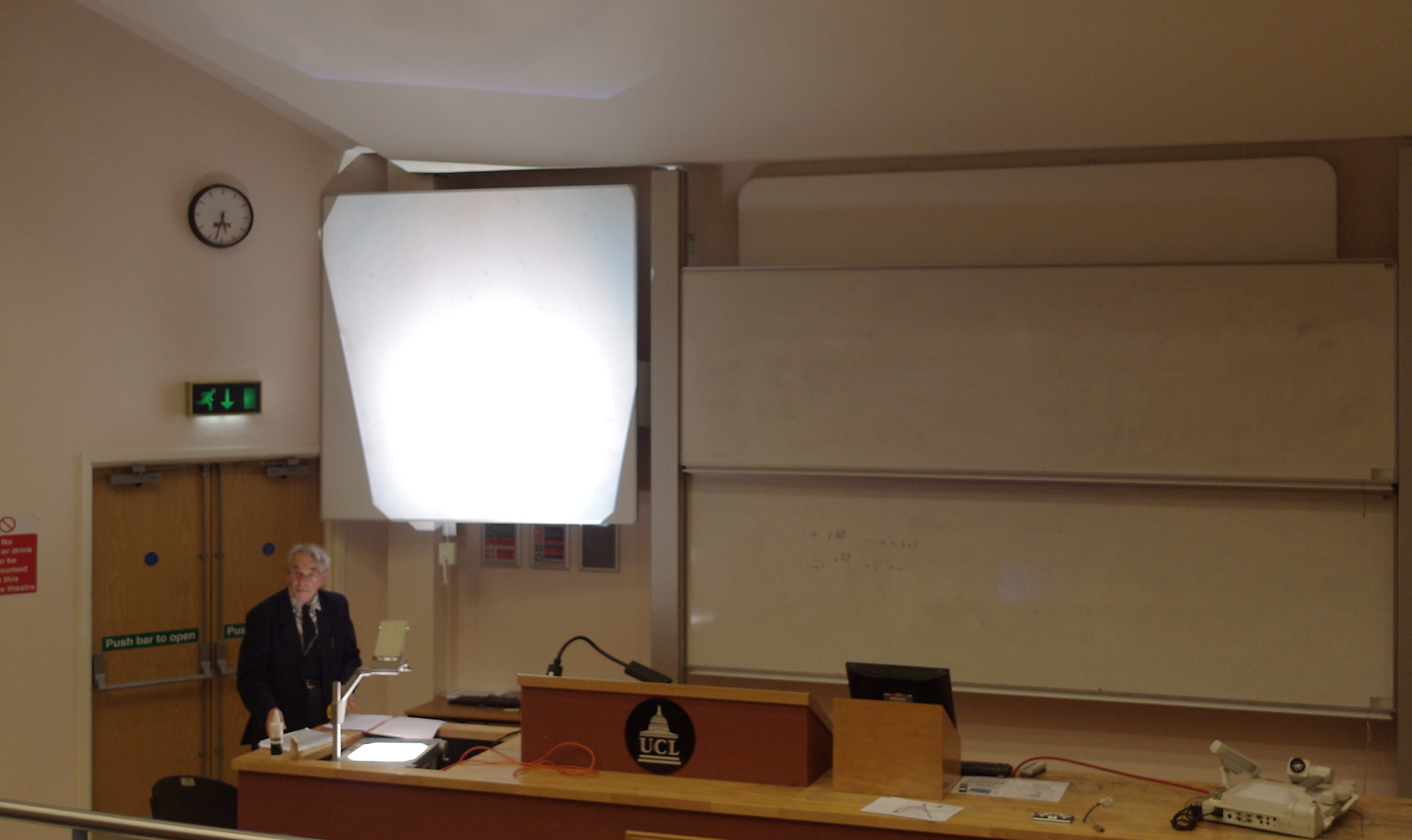
Hayman presents a talk at the 2010 One Day Function Theory Meeting.

=== Papers ===
- Hayman, W. K. (1952), "Functions with values in a given domain", Proceedings of the American Mathematical Society, 3 (3): 428–432, doi:10.1090/S0002-9939-1952-0049323-9, MR 0049323, Zbl 0048.31402.
- Hayman, W. K. (1974), "The local growth of power series: a survey of the Wiman-Valiron method", Canadian Mathematical Bulletin, 17 (3): 317–358, doi:10.4153/CMB-1974-064-0, MR 0385095, Zbl 0314.30021.
- Hayman, W. K.; Rossi, J. F. (1984), "Characteristic, maximum modulus and value distribution", Transactions of the American Mathematical Society, 284 (2): 651–664, doi:10.1090/S0002-9947-1984-0743737-2, MR 0743737, Zbl 0547.30023.
- Hayman, Walter K. (1993), "A problem on Fourier series arising from an Isoperimetric inequality", in Ricci, Paolo Emilio (ed.), Problemi attuali dell'analisi e della fisica matematica. Atti del simposio internazionale dedicato a Gaetano Fichera nel suo 70^{o} compleanno. Taormina, 15–17 ottobre 1992, Roma: Dipartimento di Matematica Università di Roma La Sapienza – Aracne Editrice, pp. 119–125, MR 1249093, Zbl 0851.42009.
- Hayman, W. K. (2002), "Univalent and Multivalent Functions", in Kuhnau, Reiner (ed.), Geometric Function Theory, Handbook of Complex Analysis, vol. 1, Amsterdam: North-Holland, pp. 1–36, ISBN 978-0-444-82845-3, MR 1966188, Zbl 1069.30018.

=== Books ===
- Hayman, W. K. (1964), Meromorphic functions, Oxford Mathematical Monographs, Oxford: Clarendon Press, pp. XIV+191, MR 0164038, Zbl 0115.06203.
- Hayman, W. K. (1967), Research Problems in Function Theory, London: Athlone Press, pp. vii+56.
- Hayman, W. K.; Kennedy, P. B. (1976), Subharmonic functions. Volume 1, London Mathematical Society Monographs, vol. 9, London–New York: Academic Press, pp. XVII+284, ISBN 978-0-12-334801-2, MR 0460672, Zbl 0419.31001.
- Hayman, W. K. (1988), Subharmonic functions. Volume 2, London Mathematical Society Monographs, vol. 20, London: Academic Press, pp. xiii+875, ISBN 978-0-12-334802-9, MR 1049148, Zbl 0699.31001.
- Hayman, W. K. (1994) [1958], Multivalent functions, Cambridge Tracts on Mathematics, vol. 110 (Second ed.), Cambridge: Cambridge University Press, pp. xii+263, ISBN 978-0-521-46026-2, MR 1310776, Zbl 0904.30001.
- Hayman, W. K. (2014), My Life and Functions, Logic Press, pp. iv+138, ISBN 978-1-326-03020-9
- Hayman, W. K.; Lingham, E. F. (2019), Research Problems in Function Theory - Fiftieth Anniversary Edition, Problem Books in Mathematics, Springer, pp. VIII+284, ISBN 978-3-030-25164-2
