= Drasin =

Drasin is a surname. Notable people with the surname include:

- David Drasin (born 1940), American mathematician
- Ric Drasin (1944–2020), American bodybuilder, personal trainer, actor, stuntman, author, and professional wrestler
- Tamara Drasin (c.1905–1943), American singer and actress
