= David Drasin =

American mathematician

David Drasin (born 3 November 1940, Philadelphia) is an American mathematician, specializing in function theory.

Drasin received in 1962 his bachelor's degree from Temple University and in 1966 his doctorate from Cornell University supervised by Wolfgang Fuchs and Clifford John Earle, Jr. with thesis An integral Tauberian theorem and other topics. After that he was an assistant professor, from 1969 an associate professor, and from 1974 a full professor at Purdue University. He was visiting professor in 2005 at the University of Kiel and in 2005/2006 at the University of Helsinki.

In 1976, Drasin gave a complete solution to the inverse problem of Nevanlinna theory (value distribution theory), which was posed by Rolf Nevanlinna in 1929. In the 1930s, the problem was investigated by Nevanlinna and by, among others, Egon Ullrich^{(de)} (1902–1957) with later investigations by Oswald Teichmüller (1913–1943), Hans Wittich, Le Van Thiem (1918–1991) and other mathematicians. Anatolii Goldberg (1930–2008) was the first to completely solve the inverse problem in the special case where the number of exceptional values is finite. For entire functions the problem was solved in 1962 by Wolfgang Fuchs and Walter Hayman. The general problem concerns the question of the existence of a meromorphic function at given values of the exceptional values and associated deficiency values and branching values (with constraints from the Nevanlinna theory). Drasin proved that there is a positive answer to Nevanlinna's problem.

In 1994 Drasin was an Invited Speaker at the ICM in Zurich. Since 1996 he is a co-editor of the Annals of the Finnish Academy of Sciences and a co-editor of Computational Methods in Function Theory. He was a co-editor of the American Mathematical Monthly from 1968 to 1971. From 2002 to 2004 he was a program director/analyst for the National Science Foundation.

He is married and has three children.

== Selected publications ==
- Tauberian theorems and slowly varying functions . Trans. Amer. Math. Soc. 133 (1968) 333–356. doi:10.1090/S0002-9947-1968-0226017-4
- with Clifford John Earle: On the boundedness of automorphic forms. Proc. Amer. Math. Soc. 19 (1968) 1039–1042. doi:10.1090/S0002-9939-1968-0239083-2
- with Daniel F. Shea: Asymptotic properties of entire functions extremal for the $\cos \,\pi \rho$ theorem. Bull. Amer. Math. Soc. 75 (1969) 119–122. doi:10.1090/S0002-9904-1969-12169-5
- with Daniel F. Shea: Pólya peaks and the oscillation of positive functions. Proc. Amer. Math. Soc. 34 (1972) 403–411. doi:10.1090/S0002-9939-1972-0294580-X
- A meromorphic function with assigned Nevanlinna deficiencies. Bull. Amer. Math. Soc. 80 (1974) 766–768. doi:10.1090/S0002-9904-1974-13595-0
- with Guang Hou Zhang, Lo Yang, and Allen Weitsman. Deficient values of entire functions and their derivatives. Proc. Amer. Math. Soc. 82 (1981) 607–612. doi:10.1090/S0002-9939-1981-0614887-9
- with Eugene Seneta: A generalization of slowly varying functions . Proc. Amer. Math. Soc. 96 (1986) 470–472. doi:10.1090/S0002-9939-1986-0822442-5
- "Proof of a conjecture of F. Nevanlinna concerning functions which have deficiency sum two." Acta Mathematica 158, no. 1 (1987): 1–94. doi:10.1007/BF02392256
- "On a method of Holopainen and Rickman." Israel Journal of Mathematics 101, no. 1 (1997): 73–84. doi:10.1007/BF02760922
- with Pekka Pannka: "Sharpness of Rickman’s Picard theorem in all dimensions." Acta Mathematica 214, no. 2 (2015): 209–306. doi:10.1007/s11511-015-0125-x
