= Wihuri International Prize =

The Wihuri International Prize is a prize awarded by the Wihuri Foundation for International Prizes to people who have furthered the cultural or economic development in Finland, founded in 1953 by Antti Wihuri, The foundation also awards the music prize Wihuri Sibelius Prize. The awarded prizes range from EUR 30,000 to 150,000, and a prize must be awarded at least every three years.

The first Wihuri International Prize was awarded on October 9, 1958, the birthday of Antti Wihuri, to mathematics professor Rolf Nevanlinna. As of 2026, the Wihuri Foundation for International Prizes has awarded the Wihuri International Prize 22 times, most recently to Finnish wood chemistry professor Tapani Vuorinen in 2026.

== Prizewinners ==
Year	Recipient	Country
1958	Rolf Nevanlinna	Finland
1961	Pentti I. Halonen	Finland
1961	Väinö Hovi	Finland
1968	John McMichael	United Kingdom
1968	Lars Ahlfors	Finland
1971	Peter Hirsch	Germany
1976	Georg Henrik von Wright	Finland
1976	Jaakko Hintikka	Finland
1977	Erik Tawaststjerna	Finland
1979	Derrick B. Jelliffe	United Kingdom
1982	Aldo van Eyck	Netherlands
1983	Aksel C. Wiin-Nielsen	Denmark
1985	John Williams Mellor	United States
1988	Kullervo Kuusela	Finland
1991	Kari I. Kivirikko	Finland
1994	Olli Lounasmaa	Finland
1997	Niilo O.B. Hallman	Finland
2003	Barbara Czarniawska	Poland
2012	Merja Penttilä	Finland
2015	Thania Paffenholz	Germany
2017	Markku Kulmala	Finland
2020	Navin Ramankutty	Canada
2023	Emmanuel Saez	France
2026	Tapani Vuorinen	Finland
