= Nevanlinna theory =

Area of mathematics

In the mathematical field of complex analysis, Nevanlinna theory is part of the theory of meromorphic functions. It was devised in 1925, by Rolf Nevanlinna. Hermann Weyl called it "one of the few great mathematical events of (the twentieth) century." The theory describes the asymptotic distribution of solutions of the equation f(z) = a, as a varies. A fundamental tool is the Nevanlinna characteristic T(r, f) which measures the rate of growth of a meromorphic function.

Other main contributors in the first half of the 20th century were Lars Ahlfors, André Bloch, Henri Cartan, Edward Collingwood, Otto Frostman, Frithiof Nevanlinna, Henrik Selberg, Tatsujiro Shimizu, Oswald Teichmüller, and Georges Valiron. In its original form, Nevanlinna theory deals with meromorphic functions of one complex variable defined in a disc |z| ≤ R or in the whole complex plane (R = ∞). Subsequent generalizations extended Nevanlinna theory to algebroid functions, holomorphic curves, holomorphic maps between complex manifolds of arbitrary dimension, quasiregular maps and minimal surfaces.

This article describes mainly the classical version for meromorphic functions of one variable, with emphasis on functions meromorphic in the complex plane. General references for this theory are Goldberg & Ostrovskii, Hayman and Lang (1987).

== Nevanlinna characteristic ==
=== Nevanlinna's original definition ===
Let f be a meromorphic function. For every r ≥ 0, let n(r,f) be the number of poles, counting multiplicity, of the meromorphic function f in the disc |z| ≤ r. Then define the Nevanlinna counting function by

$$N(r,f) = \int\limits_0^r\left( n(t,f) - n(0,f) \right)\dfrac{dt}{t} + n(0,f)\log r.\,$$

This quantity measures the growth of the number of poles in the discs |z| ≤ r, as r increases. Explicitly, let a_{1}, a_{2}, ..., a_{n} be the poles of ƒ in the punctured disc 0 < |z| ≤ r repeated according to multiplicity. Then n = n(r,f) - n(0,f), and

$$N(r,f) = \sum_{k=1}^{n} \log \left( \frac{r}{|a_k|}\right) + n(0,f)\log r .\,$$

Let log^{+}x = max(log x, 0). Then the proximity function is defined by

$$m(r,f)=\frac{1}{2\pi}\int_{0}^{2\pi}\log^+ \left| f(re^{i\theta})\right| d\theta. \,$$

Finally, define the Nevanlinna characteristic by (cf. Jensen's formula for meromorphic functions)

$$T(r,f) = m(r,f) + N(r,f).\,$$

=== Ahlfors–Shimizu version ===
A second method of defining the Nevanlinna characteristic is based on the formula

$$\int_0^r\frac{dt}{t}\left(\frac{1}{\pi}\int_{|z|\leq t}\frac{|f'|^2}{(1+|f|^2)^2}dm\right)=T(r,f)+O(1), \,$$

where dm is the area element in the plane. The expression in the left hand side is called the Ahlfors–Shimizu characteristic. The bounded term O(1) is not important in most questions.

The geometric meaning of the Ahlfors—Shimizu characteristic is the following. The inner integral dm is the spherical area of the image of the disc |z| ≤ t, counting multiplicity (that is, the parts of the Riemann sphere covered k times are counted k times). This area is divided by π which is the area of the whole Riemann sphere. The result can be interpreted as the average number of sheets in the covering of the Riemann sphere by the disc |z| ≤ t. Then this average covering number is integrated with respect to t with weight 1/t.

=== Properties ===
The role of the characteristic function in the theory of meromorphic functions in the plane is similar to that of

$$\log M(r, f) = \log \max_{|z|\leq r} |f(z)| \,$$

in the theory of entire functions. In fact, it is possible to directly compare T(r,f) and M(r,f) for an entire function:

$$T(r,f) \leq \log^+ M(r,f) \,$$

and

$$\log M(r,f) \leq \left(\dfrac{R+r}{R-r}\right)T(R,f),\,$$

for any R > r.

If f is a rational function of degree d, then T(r,f) ~ d log r; in fact, T(r,f) = O(log r) if and only if f is a rational function.

The order of a meromorphic function is defined by

$$\rho(f) = \limsup_{r \rightarrow \infty} \dfrac{\log^+ T(r,f)}{\log r}.$$

Functions of finite order constitute an important subclass which was much studied.

When the radius R of the disc |z| ≤ R, in which the meromorphic function is defined, is finite, the Nevanlinna characteristic may be bounded. Functions in a disc with bounded characteristic, also known as functions of bounded type, are exactly those functions that are ratios of bounded analytic functions. Functions of bounded type may also be so defined for another domain such as the upper half-plane.

== First fundamental theorem ==
Let a ∈ C, and define

$$\quad N(r,a,f) = N\left(r,\dfrac{1}{f-a}\right),
\quad m(r,a,f) = m\left(r,\dfrac{1}{f-a}\right).\,$$

For a = ∞, we set N(r,∞,f) = N(r,f), m(r,∞,f) = m(r,f).

The First Fundamental Theorem of Nevanlinna theory states that for every a in the Riemann sphere,

$$T(r,f) = N(r,a,f)+m(r,a,f) + O(1),\,$$

where the bounded term O(1) may depend on f and a. For non-constant meromorphic functions in the plane, T(r, f) tends to infinity as r tends to infinity, so the First Fundamental Theorem says that the sum N(r,a,f) + m(r,a,f), tends to infinity at the rate which is independent of a. The first Fundamental theorem is a simple consequence of Jensen's formula.

The characteristic function has the following properties of the degree:

$$\begin{array}{lcl}
T(r,fg)&\leq&T(r,f)+T(r,g)+O(1),\\
T(r,f+g)&\leq& T(r,f)+T(r,g)+O(1),\\
T(r,1/f)&=&T(r,f)+O(1),\\
T(r,f^m)&=&mT(r,f)+O(1), \,
\end{array}$$

where m is a natural number. The bounded term O(1) is negligible when T(r,f) tends to infinity. These algebraic properties are easily obtained from Nevanlinna's definition and Jensen's formula.

== Second fundamental theorem ==
We define N̅(r, f) in the same way as N(r,f) but without taking multiplicity into account (i.e. we only count the number of distinct poles). Then N_{1}(r,f) is defined as the Nevanlinna counting function of critical points of f, that is

$$N_1(r,f) = 2N(r,f) - N(r,f') + N\left(r,\dfrac{1}{f'}\right) = N(r,f) + \overline{N}(r,f) + N\left(r,\dfrac{1}{f'}\right).\,$$

The Second Fundamental theorem says that for every k distinct values a_{j} on the Riemann sphere, we have

$$\sum_{j=1}^k m(r,a_j,f) \leq 2 T(r,f) - N_1(r,f) + S(r,f). \,$$

This implies

$$(k-2)T(r,f) \leq \sum_{j=1}^k \overline{N}(r,a_j,f) + S(r,f),\,$$

where S(r,f) is a "small error term".

For functions meromorphic in the plane, S(r,f) = o(T(r,f)), outside a set of finite length i.e. the error term is small in comparison with the characteristic for "most" values of r. Much better estimates of the error term are known, but Andre Bloch conjectured and Hayman proved that one cannot dispose of an exceptional set.

The Second Fundamental Theorem allows to give an upper bound for the characteristic function in terms of N(r,a). For example, if f is a transcendental entire function, using the Second Fundamental theorem with k = 3 and a_{3} = ∞, we obtain that f takes every value infinitely often, with at most two exceptions, proving Picard's Theorem.

Nevanlinna's original proof of the Second Fundamental Theorem was based on the so-called Lemma on the logarithmic derivative, which says that m(r,f'/f) = S(r,f). A similar proof also applies to many multi-dimensional generalizations. There are also differential-geometric proofs which relate it to the Gauss–Bonnet theorem. The Second Fundamental Theorem can also be derived from the metric-topological theory of Ahlfors, which can be considered as an extension of the Riemann–Hurwitz formula to the coverings of infinite degree.

The proofs of Nevanlinna and Ahlfors indicate that the constant 2 in the Second Fundamental Theorem is related to the Euler characteristic of the Riemann sphere. However, there is a very different explanations of this 2, based on a deep analogy with number theory discovered by Charles Osgood and Paul Vojta. According to this analogy, 2 is the exponent in the Thue–Siegel–Roth theorem. On this analogy with number theory we refer to the survey of Lang (1987) and the book by Ru (2001).

== Defect relation ==
The defect relation is one of the main corollaries from the Second Fundamental Theorem. The defect of a meromorphic function at the point a is defined by the formula

$$\delta(a,f)=\liminf_{r \rightarrow \infty}\frac{m(r,a,f)}{T(r,f)} = 1 - \limsup_{r \rightarrow \infty} \dfrac{N(r,a,f)}{T(r,f)}. \,$$

By the First Fundamental Theorem, 0 ≤ δ(a,f) ≤ 1, if T(r,f) tends to infinity (which is always the case for non-constant functions meromorphic in the plane). The points a for which δ(a,f) > 0 are called deficient values. The Second Fundamental Theorem implies that the set of deficient values of a function meromorphic in the plane is at most countable and the following relation holds:

$$\sum_{a}\delta(a,f)\leq 2, \,$$

where the summation is over all deficient values. This can be considered as a generalization of Picard's theorem. Many other Picard-type theorems can be derived from the Second Fundamental Theorem.

As another corollary from the Second Fundamental Theorem, one can obtain that

$$T(r,f')\leq 2 T(r,f)+S(r,f),\,$$

which generalizes the fact that a rational function of degree d has 2d − 2 < 2d critical points.

== Applications ==
Nevanlinna theory is useful in all questions where transcendental meromorphic functions arise, like analytic theory of differential and functional equations holomorphic dynamics, minimal surfaces, and complex hyperbolic geometry, which deals with generalizations of Picard's theorem to higher dimensions.

== Further development ==
A substantial part of the research in functions of one complex variable in the 20th century was focused on Nevanlinna theory. One direction of this research was to find out whether the main conclusions of Nevanlinna theory are best possible. For example, the Inverse Problem of Nevanlinna theory consists in constructing meromorphic functions with pre-assigned deficiencies at given points. This was solved by David Drasin in 1976. Another direction was concentrated on the study of various subclasses of the class of all meromorphic functions in the plane. The most important subclass consists of functions of finite order. It turns out that for this class, deficiencies are subject to several restrictions, in addition to the defect relation (Norair Arakelyan, David Drasin, Albert Edrei, Alexandre Eremenko, Wolfgang Fuchs, Anatolii Goldberg, Walter Hayman, Joseph Miles, Daniel Shea, Oswald Teichmüller, Alan Weitsman and others).

Henri Cartan, Joachim and Hermann Weyl and Lars Ahlfors extended Nevanlinna theory to holomorphic curves. This extension is the main tool of Complex Hyperbolic Geometry. Henrik Selberg and Georges Valiron extended Nevanlinna theory to algebroid functions. Intensive research in the classical one-dimensional theory still continues.

== See also ==
- Vojta's conjecture
