= Margaret Hayman =

British mathematics educator

Margaret Hayman FIMA (1923 – 26 July 1994, born Margaret Riley Crann) was a British mathematics educator who co-founded the British Mathematical Olympiad, wrote mathematics textbooks, and became president of the Mathematical Association.

== Life ==
Margaret Riley Crann was born on 7 August 1923 in New Earswick in North Yorkshire, where her father Thomas Crann was a research chemist and her mother a teacher; she grew up as a Quaker. After studying at the Mill Mount School in York, she read mathematics and then geography in Newnham College, Cambridge, and earned a master's degree from the University of Cambridge, beginning in 1941 and finishing in 1944. She became a social worker in Birmingham for a year before taking a position as a mathematics teacher at Putney High School, a girls' school in London where she eventually became head of mathematics.

In 1947, she married mathematician Walter Hayman. He writes that they met at the Jesus Lane Friends Meeting House in Cambridge, in her third and his first year at Cambridge, and that they fell in love after she hit him with a celery stick for making a pun. Beyond her professional interests, she was also an amateur violinist and activist, joining the Aldermaston Marches for CND, fundraising for various causes and, in her later years, joining the board of North Yorkshire MIND.

Margaret and Walter had three daughters: Daphne, Carolyn and Sheila.

She retired from Putney High School in 1985, and returned with her husband to Yorkshire. She died on 26 July 1994.

== Contributions ==
In 1966, Hayman and her husband founded the British Mathematical Olympiad. Hayman took an active part in the meetings of proponents of the competition, helped negotiate the role of the British Olympiad in the International Mathematical Olympiad, and fought for funding for the competition and for the good will of the Mathematical Association towards the competition.

She taught master classes in mathematics teaching for the Royal Institution, and became the author of mathematical textbooks, including:

- Multiple Choice Modern Mathematics (Nelson, 1969)
- Essential Mathematics (Macmillan 1971)

She became president of the Mathematical Association for the 1974–1975 term, and a member of the council of the Institute of Mathematics and its Applications. Her philosophy as president of the Mathematical Association involved keeping the mathematics curriculum flexible enough to ensure that all pupils received a mathematical education fitting their individual needs.
