= Sheila Hayman =

Sheila Hayman (born 1956) is a British documentary filmmaker, journalist and novelist.

== Life ==
Sheila Hayman was born in 1956, one of three daughters of Walter Hayman and Margaret Hayman, who together founded the British Mathematical Olympiad. She is a descendant of the composer Fanny Mendelssohn. Her older sister is Carolyn Hayman, cofounder of Peace Direct. She was educated at Putney High School and Newnham College, Cambridge.

Hayman joined the Science department of the BBC, and later worked with Channel 4. In 1990 she was awarded a BAFTA Fulbright Fellowship in film and television by the Fulbright Commission. She moved to Los Angeles to learn screenwriting. In California she encountered the early internet, about which she made the BBC documentary The Electronic Frontier.

Hayman's film Mendelssohn, the Nazis and Me (2009) wove together the legacy of Felix Mendelssohn with the experience of her family and other Jewish survivors of Nazi Germany. The documentary was nominated for the Grierson Arts Documentary of the Year in 2010.

In 2016 Hayman was appointed a Director's Fellow at the MIT Media Lab. At MIT she began a documentary project, Senseless, on the difference between machine and human intelligence. In 2020 she was Artist in Residence at the Potsdam Institute for Climate Impact Research. The residency led to a short film, Complexity, with music by Cosmo Sheldrake, on the challenges of reducing the natural world's complexity to computer models.

Hayman's 2023 documentary Fanny: The Other Mendelssohn told the story of her great-great-great-grandmother, the composer Fanny Mendelssohn, and the rediscovery of her lost Easter Sonata.

Hayman is married to the TV producer and writer Patrick Uden. She serves on the advisory board of the Minderoo Centre for Technology and Democracy. She has a long-term job at Freedom from Torture, where she coordinates a creative writing group for torture survivors, 'Write to Life'. She has also written three comic novels.

== Works ==
=== TV ===
- (dir.) Robots: Taking the Biscuit. BBC 1, 1986.
- (producer) Killer Bimbos on Fleet Street! BBC 2, 1990.
- (dir.) The Electronic Frontier. BBC, 1993.
- (dir.) Witness: LA Coroner. Channel 4, 1997.

=== Films ===
- (dir.) Mendelssohn, the Nazis, and Me. 2009.
- (dir.) Complexity. 2020. Short film. Music by Cosmo Sheldrake.
- (dir.) Fanny: The Other Mendelssohn. 2023

=== Novels ===
- Small Talk. Hodder Headline, 2001.
- Are We Nearly There Yet? Hodder Headline, 2004
- Mrs Normal Saves the World. Various Books, 2009.
