= Bounded Type =

Bounded Type may refer to:

- Bounded type (computer science)
- Bounded type (mathematics)
