= George Springer (mathematician) =

American mathematician and computer scientist (1924–2019)

- Born: September 3, 1924; Cleveland, Ohio, U.S.
- Died: February 18, 2019 (aged 94); Newton, Massachusetts, U.S.
- Education: Case Western Reserve University; Brown University; Harvard University
- Scientific career
- Fields: Mathematics, computer science
- Workplaces: Massachusetts Institute of Technology (1949–51); Northwestern University (1951–54); University of Münster (1954–55); University of Kansas (1955–61); University of Würzburg (1961–62); Imperial College London (1971–72); Indiana University Bloomington (1964–retirement)
- Doctoral advisor: Lars Ahlfors

George Springer (September 3, 1924 – February 18, 2019) was an American mathematician and computer scientist. He was professor emeritus of computer science at Indiana University Bloomington.

Springer is perhaps best known as the coauthor with Daniel P. Friedman of the widely used textbook Scheme and the Art of Computer Programming. Scheme is one of the two main dialects of LISP. Three of the pioneering books for Scheme are The Scheme Programming Language (1982) by R. Kent Dybvig, Structure and Interpretation of Computer Programs (1985) by Harold Abelson and Gerald Jay Sussman with Julie Sussman, and Scheme and the Art of Computer Programming (1989) by Springer and Friedman.

== Career ==
Springer earned his bachelor's degree in 1945 from Case Western Reserve University (then named "Case Institute of Technology") and his master's degree in 1946 from Brown University. He earned his PhD in 1949 from Harvard University with thesis The Coefficient Problem for Univalent Mappings of the Exterior of the Unit Circle under Lars Ahlfors.

From 1949 to 1951 Springer was a C.L.E. Moore Instructor at Massachusetts Institute of Technology. From 1951 to 1954 he was an assistant professor at Northwestern University. In the academic year 1954/1955 as a Fulbright Lecturer and visiting professor at the University of Münster he worked with Heinrich Behnke. In the autumn of 1955 Springer became an associate professor and subsequently a professor at the University of Kansas. In the academic year 1961/1962 he was a Fulbright Lecturer and visiting professor at the University of Würzburg. From 1964 he was a professor of mathematics and from 1987 also a professor of computer science at Indiana University Bloomington. In the academic year 1971/1972 he was a visiting professor at Imperial College in London.

Springer began his career working in function theory (of one and several complex variables) and wrote a textbook on Riemann surfaces. In the 1980s he turned more toward computer science, working on programming languages.

== Personal life and death ==
Springer was born in Cleveland, Ohio, in 1924, to a family of Jewish immigrants from Poland. He met his wife Annemarie (née Keiner) while at Harvard University. They were married from 1950 until her death in 2011, and had three children. Springer died on February 18, 2019, aged 94.

== Works ==
- Springer, G. (1951). "The coefficient problem for schlicht mappings of the exterior of the unit circle". Trans. Amer. Math. Soc. 70 (3): 421–450. doi:10.1090/s0002-9947-1951-0041935-5. MR 0041935.
- Springer, George (1963). "Fredholm eigenvalues and quasiconformal mapping" (PDF). Bull. Amer. Math. Soc. 69 (6): 810–811. doi:10.1090/S0002-9904-1963-11043-5. MR 0161975.
- from Springer's lectures with notes prepared by Günter Scheja, Arnold Oberschelp, and Hans Rüdiger Wiehle: Einführung in die Topologie, Münster, Aschendorff 1955
- Introduction to Riemann Surfaces, Addison-Wesley 1957; 2nd edition, Chelsea 1981; 3rd edition, American Mathematical Society, 2001
- with Daniel P. Friedman: Scheme and the Art of Programming, MIT Press 1989, 9th printing 1997
