= Holomorphic curve =

In mathematics, in the field of complex geometry, a holomorphic curve in a complex manifold M is a non-constant holomorphic map f from the complex plane to M.

Nevanlinna theory addresses the question of the distribution of values of a holomorphic curve in the complex projective line.

== See also ==
- Pseudoholomorphic curve
