= British Mathematical Olympiad Subtrust =

Section of the UK Mathematics Trust

The British Mathematical Olympiad Subtrust (BMOS) is a section of the United Kingdom Mathematics Trust which currently runs the British Mathematical Olympiad as well as the UK Mathematical Olympiad for Girls, several training camps throughout the year such as a winter camp in Hungary, an Easter camp at Trinity College, Cambridge, and other training and selection of the International Mathematical Olympiad team. Since 1999, it also organizes the UK National Mathematics Summer Schools. It was established alongside the British Mathematical Olympiad Committee (BMOC) in 1991 with the support of the Edinburgh Mathematical Society, Institute of Mathematics and its Applications, the London Mathematical Society, and the Mathematical Association, each nominated two members. The BMOS replaced some of the Mathematical Association's activities.

== History ==
In 1996, the United Kingdom Mathematics Trust (UKMT) was set up to manage competitions of this nature, though the BMOC remained in charge of the senior olympiads.

== Problems group ==
The 'problems group' is a subsection of the BMOS which is responsible for supplying new and interesting problems for use domestic competitions and for submission to the IMO each year.
