= John Williams Mellor =

French-born American economist (born 1928)

- Born: December 28, 1928 (age 97); Neuilly-sur-Seine, France
- Education: Cornell University (BS, MS, PhD); University of Oxford (MSc)
- Known for: Economic and agricultural development
- Awards: Wihuri International Prize (1985)
- Scientific career
- Fields: Economics
- Workplaces: Cornell University (1952–77); United States Agency for International Development (USAID) (1972–77); International Food Policy Research Institute (IFPRI) (1977–91); John Mellor Associates (JMA) (1991–98, 2007–current); Abt Associates, Inc. (1998–2006)
- Doctoral students: Lee Teng-hui

John Williams Mellor (born December 28, 1928) is a French-born American economist, known for his work in the field of economic and agricultural development in third world countries. In 1985, he was awarded the Wihuri International Prize, for his “constructive work that has remarkably promoted and developed the security of nutrient supply for mankind.” A Fulbright Scholar, he spent most of his academic career at his alma mater, Cornell University. In the early 1970s, he became an economist for USAID, eventually becoming their chief economist in 1976. After leaving USAID, he became the second director-general of the International Food Policy Research Institute in 1977, where he remained until 1990. He has authored numerous articles, and several books, chiefly regarding economic and agricultural development in third world countries. Currently he runs John Mellor Associates as well as being a professor emeritus at Cornell.

== Early life and education ==
Mellor was born in Neuilly-sur-Seine, a suburb of Paris, France, on December 28, 1928. His parents were Desmond W. and Katherine (Beardsley) Mellor, and the family immigrated to the United States in 1929. He graduated from Okemos High School in Okemos, Michigan, before attending Cornell University, where he received a Bachelor of Science degree with distinction in 1950, followed by a M.S. in 1951, both in economics. As undergraduate, he was a member of Telluride House and Quill and Dagger. He then attended Oxford University on a Fulbright Scholarship, where he obtained a diploma in agriculture economics, before returning to Cornell where he was awarded a Ph.D. (with distinction) in agricultural economics. While working towards his doctorate, he was selected as a fellow of the Social Science Research Council.

== Career ==
After graduation, Mellor became a lecturer at his alma mater. He worked in the following departments during his tenure at the university:Agricultural Economics, Economics, and Asian Studies. He eventually attained the rank of professor, and eventual professor emeritus. From 1961 to 1964, he was the associate director for the university's Center for International Studies, followed by becoming director in 1964–65. He was also the director of the university's Program on Comparative Economic Development between 1973 and 1977. In the early 70s, he joined USAID as economist, eventually rising to become their chief economist in 1976, a post he held through 1977. While at USAID, during the world food crisis of 1973–74, Mellor's expertise and advice was crucial to the U.S. response to that crisis and the humanitarian efforts which were put forward. His influence was also fundamental in the creation of the International Food Policy Research Institute in 1975, of which he became their second director-general in 1977. A post he held through 1991. He has also served as a professor at the American University of Beirut, as well as at Balwant Rajput College in India. Mellor served as a member of the Agricultural Credit Commission for the Reserve Bank India between 1986 and 1988, and then served on the board on agriculture at the National Academy of Sciences from 1989 to 1992.

...the faster agriculture grows, the faster its relative share declines.

== Accomplishments ==
- American Agricultural Economics Association Award - Best Published Research (1967)
- Fellow, American Academy of Arts and Sciences
- American Agricultural Economics Association Award - Publication of Enduring Quality (1978), for his 1967 book, The Economics of Agricultural Development
- Fellow, American Agricultural Economics Association (since 1980)
- Wihuri International Prize (1985)
- Presidential Award (The White House, USA)
- Fellow, American Association for the Advancement of Science

== Significant publications ==
=== Books ===
- Agricultural Development and Economic Transformation (2017) - Named one of the best economy books of 2017 by The Financial Times
- Agricultural Price Policy for Developing Countries (1988)
- Accelerating Food Production in Sub-Saharan Africa (1987)
- The New Economics of Growth (1976)
- The Economics of Agricultural Development (1967) - won the American Agricultural Economics Association award

== Articles ==
While he has written (or co-written) hundreds of articles, these are some of his most cited:

- "The World Food Equation: Interrelations Among Development, Employment, and Food Consumption" (1984 - co-authored with Bruce F. Johnston)
- "Food Price Policy and Income Distribution in Low-Income Countries" (1978)
- "The role of agriculture in economic development" - The American Economic Review (1961)
