= United Kingdom Mathematics Trust =

UK charity

UKMT
- United Kingdom Mathematics Trust
- Formation: 1996
- Purpose: charity
- Website: www.ukmt.org.uk

The United Kingdom Mathematics Trust (UKMT) is a charity founded in 1996 to help with the education of children in mathematics within the UK.

== History ==
The national mathematics competitions had existed prior to the formation of the trust, but the foundation of the UKMT in the summer of 1996 enabled them to be run collectively. The Senior Mathematical Challenge was formerly called the National Mathematics Contest. Founded in 1961, it was run by the Mathematical Association from 1975 until its adoption by the UKMT in 1996. The Junior and Intermediate Mathematical Challenges were the initiative of Tony Gardiner in 1987, and were run by him under the name of the United Kingdom Mathematics Foundation until 1996. In 1995, Gardiner advertised for the formation of a committee and for a host institution that would lead to the establishment of the UKMT, enabling the challenges to be run effectively together under one organization.

== Mathematical Challenges ==
The UKMT runs a series of mathematics challenges to encourage children's interest in mathematics and to develop their skills. The three main challenges are:

- Junior Mathematical Challenge (UK year 8/S2 and below)
- Intermediate Mathematical Challenge (UK year 11/S4 and below)
- Senior Mathematical Challenge (UK year 13/S6 and below)
- Primary Mathematical Challenge (UK year 6/S2 and below)

== Certificates ==
In the Junior and Intermediate Challenges the top scoring 50% of the entrants receive bronze, silver or gold certificates based on their mark in the paper. In the Senior Mathematical Challenge these certificates are awarded to top scoring 66% of the entries. In each case bronze, silver and gold certificates are awarded in the ratio 3 : 2 : 1. So in the Junior and Intermediate Challenges

- The Gold award is achieved by the top 8-9% of the entrants.
- The Silver award is achieved by 16-17% of the entrants.
- The Bronze award is achieved by 25% of the entrants.

In the past, only the top 40% of participants received a certificate in the Junior and Intermediate Challenges, and only the top 60% of participants received a certificate in the Senior Challenge. The ratio of bronze, silver, and gold have not changed, still being 3 : 2 : 1.

== Junior Mathematical Challenge ==
The Junior Mathematical Challenge (JMC) is an introductory challenge for pupils in Years 8 or below (aged 13 or below), taking place in late April or early May each year. This takes the form of twenty-five multiple choice questions to be sat in exam conditions, to be completed within one hour. The first fifteen questions are designed to be easier, and a pupil will gain 5 marks for getting a question in this section correct. Questions 16-20 are more difficult and are worth 6 marks. The last five questions are intended to be the most challenging and so are also 6 marks. Questions to which no answer is entered will gain (and lose) 0 marks. However, in recent years there has been no negative marking so wrong questions will be given 0 marks. Previously, the top 40% of students (50% since the 2022 JMC) get a certificate of varying levels (Gold, Silver or Bronze) based on their score. The Junior Mathematical Challenge has follow-on rounds called the: Junior Kangaroo and the more difficult Junior Mathematical Olympiad (JMO). The average score for to qualify for the Junior Kangaroo is 88 and the JMO is 104. However, please note that the pass marks for certificates and follow-on rounds have been at an all-time high, making it increasingly difficult to achieve a qualification for the Junior Kangaroo and JMO.

Summary of UKMT Junior Challenges
Challenge	Eligibility	When	Duration	No. of Qs	Questions	Max Score	Certificates
Junior Mathematical Challenge(JMC)	England Wales and Overseas: Y8 or below Scotland: S2 or below Northern Ireland: Y9 or below	Late April	60 mins	25	Questions 1-15 (multi-choice) 5 marks each Questions 16-25 (multi-choice) 6 marks each	135	Top 50% of candidates in ratio 3:2:1 get: Bronze, Silver, Gold.
Junior Kangaroo	Good performance (at least Gold certificate) in JMC OR discretionary entry at some fee.	weeks after JMC	60 mins	25	Questions 1-15 (multi-choice) 5 marks each Questions 16-25 (multi-choice) 6 marks each	135	Top 10% get Gold Kangaroo Certificate, the next 20% get Silver Kangaroo Certificate, and the next 30% get a Bronze Kangaroo Certificate. Remaining 40% get Certificate of Qualification or Participation.
Junior Mathematical Olympiad	Around top 1,200 performers in JMC invited. Discretionary entry also available.	weeks after JMC	120 mins	16 (From 2025, 10)	Section A Questions 1-10 (correct answer only) 1 mark each Section B Questions 11-16 (answer with solution) 0~10 marks each From 2025 onwards, Section A (Questions 1-10) was removed and there were only be 6 questions (Section B). The format and marking stayed the same.	70 (From 2025, 60)	Top 25% get Certificate of Distinction. Next 40% get Certificate of Merit. Remaining 35% get Certificate of Qualification or Participation. Top 40 get a gold medal, the next 60 a silver medal, the next 100 a bronze medal. All medalists receive a book prize. Only questions 11-16 are considered for medals

=== Junior Kangaroo ===
Over 10,000 participants from the JMC are invited to participate in the Junior Kangaroo. Most of the Junior Kangaroo participants are those who performed well in the JMC, however the Junior Kangaroo is open to discretionary entries for a fee. Similar to the JMC, the Junior Kangaroo is a 60 minute challenge consisting of 25 multiple-choice problems. Correct answers for Questions 1-15 earn 5 marks, and for Questions 16-25 earn 6 marks. Blank or incorrect answers are marked 0; there is no penalty for wrong answers.

The top 10% of participants in the Junior Kangaroo receive a Gold Kangaroo Certificate, the next 20% receive a Silver Kangaroo Certificate, and the next 30% receive a Bronze Kangaroo Certificate

=== Junior Mathematical Olympiad ===
The highest 1200 scorers are also invited to take part in the Junior Mathematical Olympiad (JMO). Like the JMC, the JMO is sat in schools. Students are given 120 minutes to complete the JMO. This is also divided into two sections. Part A is composed of 10 questions in which the candidate gives just the answer (not multiple choice), worth 10 marks (1 mark each). Part B consists of 6 questions and encourages students to write out full solutions. Each question in section B is worth 10 marks and students are encouraged to write complete answers to 2-4 questions rather than hurry through incomplete answers to all 6. If the solution is judged to be incomplete, it is marked on a 0+ basis, maximum 3 marks. If it has an evident logical strategy, it is marked on a 10- basis. The total mark for the whole paper is 70. Everyone who participates in this challenge will gain a certificate (Participation 75%, Distinction 25%); the top 200 or so gaining medals (Gold, Silver, Bronze); with the top fifty winning a book prize.

From 2025, this has changed as Part A has been omitted. Section B has stayed the same, though it is no longer called Section B (it is now the only section). This changes the total number of questions to 6 from 16 and the marks to 60 from 70. However the time given for the JMO has stayed at 120 minutes.

== Intermediate Mathematical Challenge ==
The Intermediate Mathematical Challenge (IMC) is aimed at school years equivalent to English Years 9-11, taking place in winter each year. Following the same structure as the JMC, this paper presents the student with twenty-five multiple choice questions to be done under exam conditions in one hour. The first fifteen questions are designed to be easier, and a pupil will gain 5 marks for getting a question in this section correct. Questions 16-20 are more difficult and are worth 6 marks, with a penalty of 1 point for a wrong answer which tries to stop pupils guessing. The last five questions are intended to be the most challenging and so are also 6 marks, but with a 2 point penalty for an incorrectly answered question. Questions to which no answer is entered will gain (and lose) 0 marks.

Again, the top 50% of students taking this challenge get a certificate. There are two follow-on rounds to this competition: The Pink and Grey Kangaroo and the 3 Intermediate Mathematical Olympiads, dependent on year group. Additionally, top performers can be selected for the National Mathematics Summer Schools.

Summary of UKMT Intermediate Challenges
Challenge	Eligibility		When	Duration	No. of Qs	Questions	Max Score	Certificates
Intermediate Mathematical Challenge(IMC)	England Wales and Overseas: Y11 or below Scotland: S4 or below Northern Ireland: Y12 or below		February	60 mins	25	Questions 1-15 (multi-choice) 5 marks each Questions 16-20 (multi-choice) 6 marks each / penalty of 1 if wrong answer chosen Questions 21-25 (multi-choice) 6 marks each / penalty of 2 if wrong answer chosen	135	Top 50% of candidates in ratio 3:2:1 get: Bronze, Silver, Gold.
Grey Kangaroo	Invitation from good IMC performance (around 8,000 invitations), OR discretionary entry at a fee.	Y9 or below	March	60 mins	25	Questions 1-15 (multi-choice) 5 marks each Questions 16-25 (multi-choice) 6 marks each	135	Separately awarded for each Kangaroo's cohort:Top 25% of candidates receive a Certificate of Merit. Remaining 75% get Certificate of Qualification or Participation.
Pink Kangaroo	Invitation from good IMC performance (around 8,000 invitations), OR discretionary entry at a fee.	Y10/11	March	60 mins	25	Questions 1-15 (multi-choice) 5 marks each Questions 16-25 (multi-choice) 6 marks each	135	Separately awarded for each Kangaroo's cohort:Top 25% of candidates receive a Certificate of Merit. Remaining 75% get Certificate of Qualification or Participation.
Cayley Mathematical Olympiad	Invitation from good IMC performance (usually top 1,500), OR discretionary entry at a fee.	Y9 or below	March	120 mins	6	Questions 1-6 (answer with solution) 0~10 marks each	60	Separately awarded for each Olympiad's cohort:Highest-scoring participants receive Certificates of Distinction or Merit. Remaining participants receive Certificate of Qualification or Participation. Top 20 get a gold medal, the next 30 a silver medal, the next 50 a bronze medal. All medalists receive a book prize.
Hamilton Mathematical Olympiad	Invitation from good IMC performance (usually top 1,500), OR discretionary entry at a fee.	Y10	March	120 mins	6	Questions 1-6 (answer with solution) 0~10 marks each	60	Separately awarded for each Olympiad's cohort:Highest-scoring participants receive Certificates of Distinction or Merit. Remaining participants receive Certificate of Qualification or Participation. Top 20 get a gold medal, the next 30 a silver medal, the next 50 a bronze medal. All medalists receive a book prize.
Maclaurin Mathematical Olympiad	Invitation from good IMC performance (usually top 1,500), OR discretionary entry at a fee.	Y11	March	120 mins	6	Questions 1-6 (answer with solution) 0~10 marks each	60	Separately awarded for each Olympiad's cohort:Highest-scoring participants receive Certificates of Distinction or Merit. Remaining participants receive Certificate of Qualification or Participation. Top 20 get a gold medal, the next 30 a silver medal, the next 50 a bronze medal. All medalists receive a book prize.

=== Intermediate Mathematical Olympiad ===
To prevent this getting confused with the International Mathematical Olympiad, this is often abbreviated to the IMOK Olympiad (IMOK = Intermediate Mathematical Olympiad and Kangaroo).

The IMOK is sat by the top 500 scorers from each school year in the Intermediate Maths Challenge and consists of three papers, 'Cayley', 'Hamilton' and 'Maclaurin' named after famous mathematicians. The paper the student will undertake depends on the year group that student is in (Cayley for those in year 9 and below, Hamilton for year 10 and Maclaurin for year 11).

Each paper contains six questions. Each solution is marked out of 10 on a 0+ and 10- scale; that is to say, if an answer is judged incomplete or unfinished, it is awarded a few marks for progress and relevant observations, whereas if it is presented as complete and correct, marks are deducted for faults, poor reasoning, or unproven assumptions. As a result, it is quite uncommon for an answer to score a middling mark (e.g. 4–6). This makes the maximum mark out of 60. For a student to get two questions fully correct is considered "very good". All people taking part in this challenge will get a certificate (participation for the bottom 50%, merit for the next 25% and distinction for the top 25%). The mark boundaries for these certificates change every year, but normally around 30 marks will gain a Distinction. Those scoring highly (the top 50) will gain a book prize; again, this changes every year, with 44 marks required in the Maclaurin paper in 2006. Also, the top 100 candidates will receive a medal; the top 20 scorers in each competition get a gold, followed by silver for the next the 30, and bronze for the next 50.

=== European Kangaroo ===
The European Kangaroo is a competition which follows the same structure as the AMC (Australian Mathematics Competition). There are twenty-five multiple-choice questions and no penalty marking. This paper is taken throughout Europe by over 3 million pupils from more than 37 countries. Two different Kangaroo papers follow on from the Intermediate Maths Challenge and the next 5500 highest scorers below the Olympiad threshold are invited to take part (both papers are by invitation only). The Grey Kangaroo is sat by students in year 9 and below and the Pink Kangaroo is sat by those in years 10 and 11. The top 25% of scorers in each paper receive a certificate of merit and the rest receive a certificate of participation. All those who sit either Kangaroo also receive a keyfob containing a different mathematical puzzle each year. (The puzzles along with solutions)

=== National Mathematics Summer Schools ===
Selected by lottery, 48 of the top 1.5% of scorers in the IMC are invited to participate in one of three week-long National Mathematics Summer Schools in July. Each from a different school across the UK, the 24 boys and 24 girls are facilitated with a range of activities, including daily lectures, designed to go beyond the GCSE syllabus and explore wider and more challenging areas of mathematics. The UKMT aims to "promote mathematical thinking" and "provide an opportunity for participants to meet other students and adults who enjoy mathematics". They were delivered virtually during the COVID-19 pandemic but had reverted to in-person events by 2022.

== Senior Mathematical Challenge ==
The Senior Mathematical Challenge (SMC) takes place in late-autumn each year, and is open to students who are aged 19 or below and are not registered to attend a university. SMC consists of twenty-five multiple choice questions to be answered in 90 minutes. All candidates start with 25 marks, each correct answer is awarded 4 marks and 1 mark is deducted for each incorrect answer. This gives a score between 0 and 125 marks.

Unlike the JMC and IMC, the top 66% get one of the three certificates. Further, the top 1000 highest scorers who are eligible to represent the UK at the International Mathematical Olympiad, together with any discretionary and international candidates, are invited to compete in the British Mathematical Olympiad and the next around 6000 highest scorers are invited to sit the Senior Kangaroo. Discretionary candidates are those students who are entered by their mathematics teachers, on payment of a fee, who did not score quite well enough in the SMC, but who might cope well in the next round.

Summary of UKMT Senior Challenges
Challenge	Eligibility	When	Duration	No. of Qs	Questions	Max Score	Certificates
Senior Mathematical Challenge(SMC)	England Wales and Overseas: Y13 or below Scotland: S6 or below Northern Ireland: Y14 or below	October	90 mins	25	Questions 1-25 (multi-choice) 4 marks each / penalty of 1 if wrong answer chosen All participants start on 25 points	125	Top 66% of candidates in ratio 3:2:1 get: Bronze, Silver, Gold.
Senior Kangaroo	Invitation from good SMC performance (around 6,000 invitations), OR discretionary entry at a fee.	November	60 mins	20	Questions 1-20 (answer a number from 1 to 999) 5 marks each	100	Top 25% of candidates receive a Certificate of Merit. Remaining 75% get Certificate of Qualification or Participation.
British Mathematical Olympiad Round 1(BMO1)	Invitation from good SMC performance (usually top 1,000), OR invitation from good MOG performance, OR discretionary entry at a fee.	November	210 mins	6	Questions 1-6 (answer with solution) 0~10 marks each	60	Highest-scoring participants receive Certificates of Distinction or Merit. Remaining participants receive Certificate of Qualification or Participation. Top 20 get a gold medal, the next 30 a silver medal, the next 50 a bronze medal. All medalists receive a book prize.
British Mathematical Olympiad Round 2(BMO2)	Roughly top 100 scorers from BMO1, OR discretionary entry at a fee.	January	210 mins	4	Questions 1-4 (answer with solution) 0~10 marks each	40	Highest-scoring participants receive Certificates of Distinction or Merit. Remaining participants receive Certificate of Qualification or Participation.
Mathematical Olympiad for Girls(MOG)	Discretionary entry at a fee (first 4 entries free).	September	150 mins	5	Questions 1-5 (answer with solution) 0~10 marks each	50	Highest-scoring participants receive Certificates of Distinction or Merit. Remaining participants receive Certificate of Qualification or Participation. Top 30 get a book prize.

=== British Mathematical Olympiad ===
Round 1 of the Olympiad is a three-and-a-half hour examination including six more difficult, long answer questions, which serve to test entrants' problem-solving skills. As of 2005, a more accessible first question was added to the paper; before this, it only consisted of 5 questions. Approximately 100 highest scoring candidates from BMO1 are invited to sit the BMO2, which is the follow-up round that has the same time limit as BMO1, but in which 4 harder questions are posed. The top 24 scoring students from the second round are subsequently invited to a training camp at Trinity College, Cambridge or Oundle School for the first stage of the International Mathematical Olympiad UK team selection.

=== Senior Kangaroo ===
The Senior Kangaroo is a one-hour examination to which the next around 6000 highest scorers below the Olympiad threshold are invited. The paper consists of twenty questions, each of which require three digit answers (leading zeros are used if the answer is less than 100, since the paper is marked by machine). As of 2025, the awards system has changed so that the top 10% of entrants get a Gold Medal, the next 20% get a silver medal, and the next 30% get a bronze medal, with the remaining entrants receiving a certificate of Participation. Before 2025, the top 25% of entrants got a merit, and the remaining 75% got a certificate of participation.

== Team Challenge ==
The UKMT Team Maths Challenge is an annual event. One team from each participating school, comprising four pupils selected from year 8 and 9 (ages 12–14), competes in a regional round. No more than 2 pupils on a team may be from Year 9. There are over 60 regional competitions in the UK, held between February and May. The winning team in each regional round, as well as a few high-scoring runners-up from throughout the country, are then invited to the National Final in London, usually in late June.

There are 4 rounds:

- Group Questions
- Cross-Numbers
- Shuttle (NB: The previous Head-to-Head Round has been replaced with another, similar to the Mini-Relay used in the 2007 and 2008 National Finals.)
- Relay

In the National Final however an additional 'Poster Round' is added at the beginning. The poster round is a separate competition, however, since 2018 it is worth up to six marks towards the main event. Four schools have won the Junior Maths Team competition at least twice: Queen Mary's Grammar School in Walsall, City of London School, St Olave's Grammar School, and Westminster Under School.

Year	2010	2011	2012	2013	2014	2015	2016	2017	2018	2019	2026
Winner	Magdalen College School, Oxford	St Paul's Girls' School	Harrow School & Orley Farm School (joint team)	City of London School	City of London School	Westminster Under School	Westminster Under School	St Olave's Grammar School	Westminster Under School	Bancroft's School	Westminster Under School
2nd Place	Queen Elizabeth's Grammar School for Boys	Magdalen College School, Oxford	?	King Edward's School, Birmingham	Reading School & Colchester Royal Grammar School	Bancroft's School	-	The Judd School	-	Eton College	The Perse School
3rd Place	Clifton College	City of London School	?	Magdalen College School, Oxford	-	University College School	St Olave's Grammar School	Westminster Under School	-	Westminster Under School	Shanghai High School & Shanghai Pinghe School

== Senior Team Challenge ==
A pilot event for a competition similar to the Team Challenge, aimed at 16- to 18-year-olds, was launched in the Autumn of 2007 and ran until 2019/20, where it took a hiatus due to the COVID-19 pandemic. The STMC restarted in 2025/26. The format is much the same, with a limit of two year 13 (Upper Sixth-Form) pupils per team. Regional finals take place between October and December, with the National Final in early February the following year.

Previous winners are below:

Year	Winner	Runners-up	Third place	Poster Competition winners
2007/08	Torquay Boys' Grammar School	?	?	No competition
2008/09	Westminster School	?	?	No competition
2009/10	Westminster School	King Edward VI Grammar School, Chelmsford	Abingdon School	King Edward VI High School for Girls
2010/11	Harrow School	Colchester Royal Grammar School	Merchant Taylors' School/ Abingdon School/ Concord College (three-way tie)	North London Collegiate School
2011/12	Alton College	Dean Close School	Headington School	Royal Grammar School, Newcastle
2012/13	Westminster School	City of London School/ Eton College/ Magdalen College School (three-way tie)	-	The Grammar School at Leeds
2013/14	Hampton School	Alton College	Rainham Mark Grammar School	The Grammar School at Leeds
2014/15	Hampton School/Harrow School/King Edward's School (three-way tie)	-	-	Dunblane High School
2015/16	King Edward's School/ Ruthin School/ Westminster School (three-way tie)	-	-	Backwell School
2016/17	Ruthin School	Magdalen College School	Headington School	Royal Grammar School, Newcastle
2017/18	Ruthin School	Tapton School	King Edward's School	The Perse School
2018/19	Durham School/Westminster School (two-way tie)	-	Ruthin School/Concord College (two-way tie)	The Perse School
2019/20	Westminster School	Ruthin School	Winchester College	Bancroft’s School
2025/26	Winchester College	Tonbridge School	Brighton College	Brighton College

== British Mathematical Olympiad Subtrust ==
For more information see British Mathematical Olympiad Subtrust.

The British Mathematical Olympiad Subtrust is run by UKMT, which runs the British Mathematical Olympiad as well as the UK Mathematical Olympiad for Girls, several training camps throughout the year such as a winter camp in Hungary, an Easter camp at Trinity College, Cambridge, and other training and selection of the IMO team.

== See also ==
- European Kangaroo
- British Mathematical Olympiad
- International Mathematical Olympiad
- International Mathematics Competition for University Students
