= Chung–Fuchs theorem =

In mathematics, the Chung–Fuchs theorem, named after Chung Kai-lai and Wolfgang Heinrich Johannes Fuchs, states that for a particle undergoing a zero-mean random walk in m-dimensions, it is certain to come back infinitely often to any neighborhood of the origin on a one-dimensional line (m = 1) or two-dimensional plane (m = 2), but in three or more dimensional spaces it will leave to infinity.

Specifically, if a position of the particle is described by the vector $X_n$:
$$X_n = Z_1 + \dots + Z_n$$
where $Z_1, Z_2, \dots, Z_n$ are independent m-dimensional vectors with a given multivariate distribution,

then if $m = 1$, $E(|Z_i|) < \infty$ and $E(Z_i) = 0$, or if $m = 2$ $E(|Z^2_i|) < \infty$ and $E(Z_i) = 0$,

the following holds:
$$\forall \varepsilon > 0, \Pr(\forall n_0 \ge 0, \, \exists n\ge n_0, \, |X_n| < \varepsilon ) = 1$$

However, for $m \ge 3$,
$$\forall A>0, \Pr(\exists n_0 \ge 0, \, \forall n\ge n_0, \, |X_n| \ge A) = 1.$$
