= Tony Gardiner =

British mathematician (1947–2024)

- Born: 17 May 1947
- Died: 22 January 2024 (aged 76)
- Education: University of Warwick
- Scientific career
- Fields: Mathematics
- Workplaces: University of Birmingham

Tony Gardiner (17 May 1947 – 22 January 2024) was a British mathematician who until 2012 held the position of Reader in Mathematics and Mathematics Education at the University of Birmingham. He was responsible for the foundation of the United Kingdom Mathematics Trust in 1996, one of the UK's largest mathematics enrichment programs, initiating the Intermediate and Junior Mathematical Challenges, creating the Problem Solving Journal for secondary school students and organising numerous masterclasses, summer schools and educational conferences. Gardiner contributed to many educational articles and internationally circulated educational pamphlets. As well as his involvement with mathematics education, Gardiner has also made contributions to the areas of infinite groups, finite groups, graph theory, and algebraic combinatorics. At the time of his death he was still a member of UKMT.

In the year 1994–1995, he received the Paul Erdős Award for his contributions to UK and international mathematical challenges and Olympiads. In 2011, Gardiner was elected Education Secretary of the London Mathematical Society. In 2016 he received the Excellence in Mathematics Education Award from Texas A&M University.

Gardiner died suddenly on 22 January 2024, at the age of 76.

== UK national mathematics competitions ==
The first national mathematics competition was the National Mathematics Contest, established in 1961 by F. R. Watson. This was run by the Mathematical Association from 1975 until its adoption by the United Kingdom Mathematics Trust (UKMT) in 1996 and has in recent years been known as the Senior Mathematical Challenge. In early years, problems for this were taken from the American Annual High School Mathematics Examination, with papers subsequently formed from those used in other countries until 1988, when the first entirely local paper was produced. In 1987, Gardiner founded the Junior and Intermediate Mathematical Challenges under the name of the United Kingdom Mathematics Foundation, to expand the national mathematics competitions to a wider age range of students. Gardiner worked hard to publicise all of the national mathematics competitions from 1987 to 1995 and UKMT yearbooks state that their enormous increase in popularity was "without doubt due to the drive, energy and leadership of Tony Gardiner". The Junior and Intermediate Challenges continued to be run by Gardiner personally until the foundation of the UKMT, with numbers of entrants reaching 105,000 and 115,000 respectively in the year 1994–1995. Between 1988 and 1997, participation in the Senior Mathematical Challenge increased from around 8,000 entries from 340 schools to 40,000 from nearly 900 schools.

Gardiner also played an important role in establishing the first Primary Mathematics Challenge (PMC) in 1998. Run by the Mathematical Association, in 2010 it received more than 84,000 participants in 2,361 schools.

== United Kingdom Mathematics Trust ==
The United Kingdom Mathematics Trust was founded in 1996 to support the large pyramid of national mathematics competitions that had become well established in the UK. In 1995, Gardiner realised that, due to the enormous popularity increase that had taken place, the national mathematics competitions had become too large an enterprise to be sustained in their current form. Consequently, he advertised for the formation of a committee and a host institution to establish an organisation (the UKMT) that would be able to collectively run the competitions. This received a response from the Royal Institution and Alan Slomson of the University of Leeds, resulting in the formation of a committee of five: Gardiner, Peter M. Neumann, Alan Slomson, Roger Bray, and Peter Thomas. The establishment of the desired organisation followed.

Gardiner continued to contribute to the activities run by the UKMT, acting as leader of the IMO team in the years 1991, 1992, 1994, and 1995. He was also responsible for establishing the national mathematics summer schools.

== Secondary school problems booklets ==
In 2003, Gardiner created the Problem Solving Journal, a termly problems booklet for secondary school students, aimed at providing stimulating problems, to stretch students and encourage them to develop formal logical arguments and proofs. Each issue contains "easy" and "hard" type problems, separated into three different age ranges, plus solutions to the previous issue and an interlude, which is a short extract from a mathematical text. Students are encouraged to send their solutions to Gardiner, whence he will comment on them and publish those of particular interest as model solutions in the next issue, as well as printing the names of those students who answered the majority of the questions.

The Problem Solving Journal continued to be run independently by Gardiner, with the number of participants now in excess of 5,500.

An earlier version of this was produced by Gardiner between 1980 and 1995. The Birmingham University Mid-term Mathematical Puzzles were a take-home competition for 11- to 15-year-olds and 16- to 18-year-olds, reaching figures of 3,500 and 1,200 participants respectively.

== National Mathematics Teachers' Summer School ==
Established by Gardiner under the name of the United Kingdom Mathematics Foundation, the National Mathematics Teachers' Summer School ran for three years, from 2007 to 2009. These were intensive six-day events for 60–90 teachers, with the first aimed at more experienced teachers with the intention that they would pass the skills to others at their schools, and later courses aimed at newer teachers at the beginning of their careers. The first summer school was sponsored by the National Centre for Excellence in the Teaching of Mathematics with additional sponsorship from Trinity College, Cambridge, the TDA and the Nuffield Foundation, and was held at Robinson College, Cambridge. Speakers included Simon Singh, Robin Wilson, Colin Wright, and Rob Eastaway.

== Publications ==
Gardiner authored or coauthored 15 books on mathematics education:

- Gardiner, Anthony (1996), Mathematical Challenge, Cambridge University Press
- Gardiner, Anthony (1997), More Mathematical Challenges, Cambridge University Press
- Gardiner, Anthony (2002), Senior Mathematical Challenge: The UK National Mathematics Contest 1988–1996, Cambridge University Press
- Gardiner, Anthony (1997), The Mathematical Olympiad Handbook: An Introduction to Problem Solving based on the First 32 British Mathematical Olympiads 1965–1996, Oxford University Press
- Gardiner, Anthony (2007), Extension Mathematics: Year 7: Alpha (Extension Mathematics Ks3), Oxford University Press
- Gardiner, Anthony (2007), Extension Mathematics: Year 8: Beta (Extension Mathematics Ks3), Oxford University Press
- Gardiner, Anthony (2007), Extension Mathematics: Year 9: Gamma (Extension Mathematics Ks3), Oxford University Press
- Gardiner, Anthony (2007), Extension Mathematics: Teacher's Book, Oxford University Press
- Gardiner, Anthony (2000), Maths Challenge: Book 1, Oxford University Press
- Gardiner, Anthony (2000), Maths Challenge: Book 2, Oxford University Press
- Gardiner, Anthony (2000), Maths Challenge: Book 3, Oxford University Press
- Gardiner, Anthony (2010), Understanding Infinity: The Mathematics of Infinite Processes, Dover Publications
- Gardiner, Anthony (1987), Discovering Mathematics: The Art of Investigation, Clarendon Press
- Gardiner, Anthony (1999), Mathematical Puzzling, Dover Publications
- Bradley, Christopher; Gardiner, Anthony (2005), Plane Euclidean Geometry, UKMT

Gardiner also contributed to School Mathematics Project writing groups since 1978.

Preceded by Peter Man-Kit Shiu	UK International Mathematical Olympiad Team Leader; 1991–1992	Succeeded by Adam McBride
Preceded by Adam McBride	UK International Mathematical Olympiad Team Leader; 1994–1995	Succeeded by Adam McBride
