= Olli Lokki =

Finnish mathematician

Olli Kristian Lokki (Lindeqvist) (28 April 1916 – 6 March 1994) was a Finnish mathematician.

== Education and career ==
Loki was born in Helsinki. His father was a historian and schoolman, Karl Olof Lindeqvist. Lokki graduated in 1934 from the Normal Lyceum of Helsinki, then studied at the University of Helsinki, graduating with a master's degree in 1939 and completed his doctorate under the supervision of Rolf Nevanlinna and Pekka Myrberg in 1947. His thesis was in the field of function theory, with the title Über analytische Funktionen deren Dirichletintegrale endlich ist und die in gegebenen Punkten vorgeschriebene Werte annehmen.

Loki's studies were interrupted by wars. During the Continuation War, Lokki worked as a mathematician in the Air Defense Department of the Finnish Air Force. After the war, Lokki became an assistant at the Department of Mathematics at the University of Helsinki, and after working as a vocational school teacher for one academic year, he was appointed a lecturer in mathematics at the Helsinki University of Technology in 1945 and held this position until 1953. At that time, he was appointed assistant professor of mathematics at the same institution. From 1962 until his retirement in 1979, Lokki was a professor of applied mathematics at the Helsinki University of Technology. Lokki became a docent of mathematics at the University of Helsinki in 1952. He was the president of the Finnish Academy of Technical Sciences between 1980 and 1984.

In his teaching, Lokki particularly promoted the application of statistical and operations research methods to the solution of practical problems. The Nobel laureate Bengt Holmström studied under him at the University of Helsinki. He has a wide network outside of academic circles as well. Lokki was an honorary member of the Finnish Quality Control Association and an honorary member of the European Consortium for Mathematics in Industry. Lokki was elected a member of the Finnish Academy of Sciences in 1979.
