= Height zeta function =

In mathematics, the height zeta function of an algebraic variety or more generally a subset of a variety encodes the distribution of points of given height.

== Definition ==
If S is a set with height function H, such that there are only finitely many elements of bounded height, define a counting function

$$N(S,H,B) = \#\{ x \in S : H(x) \le B \} .$$

and a zeta function

$$Z(S,H;s) = \sum_{x \in S} H(x)^{-s} .$$

== Properties ==
If Z has abscissa of convergence β and there is a constant c such that N has rate of growth

$$N \sim c B^a (\log B)^{t-1}$$

then a version of the Wiener–Ikehara theorem holds: Z has a t-fold pole at s = β with residue c.a.Γ(t).

The abscissa of convergence has similar formal properties to the Nevanlinna invariant and it is conjectured that they are essentially the same. More precisely, Batyrev–Manin conjectured the following. Let X be a projective variety over a number field K with ample divisor D giving rise to an embedding and height function H, and let U denote a Zariski-open subset of X. Let α = α(D) be the Nevanlinna invariant of D and β the abscissa of convergence of Z(U, H; s). Then for every ε > 0 there is a U such that β < α + ε: in the opposite direction, if α > 0 then α = β for all sufficiently large fields K and sufficiently small U.
