= Teichmüller cocycle =

In mathematics, the Teichmüller cocycle is a certain 3-cocycle associated to a simple algebra A over a field L which is a finite Galois extension of a field K and which has the property that any automorphism of L over K extends to an automorphism of A. The Teichmüller cocycle, or rather its cohomology class, is the obstruction to the algebra A coming from a simple algebra over K. It was introduced by Teichmüller (1940) and named by Eilenberg and MacLane (1948).

== Properties ==
If K is a finite normal extension of the global field k, then the Galois cohomology group H^{3}(Gal(K/k);K*) is cyclic and generated by the Teichmüller cocycle. Its order is n/m where n is the degree of the extension K/k and m is the least common multiple of all the local degrees (Artin & Tate 2009, p.68).
