= Wolfgang Heinrich Johannes Fuchs =

German mathematician (1915–1997)

Wolfgang Fuchs
- Born: May 19, 1915
- Died: February 24, 1997 (aged 81)
- Education: University of Cambridge
- Scientific career
- Workplaces: Cornell University
- Doctoral advisor: Albert Ingham
- Doctoral students: David Drasin

Wolfgang Heinrich Johannes Fuchs (May 19, 1915 – February 24, 1997) was a British mathematician specializing in complex analysis. His main area of research was Nevanlinna theory.

Fuchs received his Ph.D. in 1941 from the University of Cambridge, under the direction of Albert Ingham. He joined the faculty of Cornell University in 1950 and spent the rest of his career there.

== See also ==
- Erdős–Fuchs theorem
- Chung–Fuchs theorem
