= P-basis =

In algebra, a p-basis is a generalization of the notion of a separating transcendence basis for a field extension of characteristic p, introduced by Teichmüller (1936).

== Definition ==
Suppose k is a field of characteristic p and K is a field extension. A p-basis is a set of elements x_{i} of K such that the elements dx_{i} form a basis for the K-vector space Ω_{K/k} of differentials.

== Examples ==
- If K is a finitely generated separable extension of k then a p-basis is the same as a separating transcendence basis. In particular in this case the number of elements of the p-basis is the transcendence degree.
- If k is a field, x an indeterminate, and K the field generated by all elements x^{1/p^{n}} then the empty set is a p-basis, though the extension is separable and has transcendence degree 1.
- If K is a degree p extension of k obtained by adjoining a pth root t of an element of k then t is a p-basis, so a p-basis has cardinality 1 while the transcendence degree is 0.
