= Kurt Strebel =

Swiss mathematician

Kurt Strebel (20 April 1921 – 26 October 2013) was a Swiss mathematician, specializing in geometric function theory.

== Education and career ==
Strebel was born on 20 April 1921 in Wohlen, Aargau. received in 1953 his PhD from the University of Zurich under Rolf Nevanlinna with thesis Über das Kreisnormierungsproblem der konformen Abbildung (On the circle normalization problem of conformal mapping). From 1953 to 1955 he was at the Institute for Advanced Study and at Stanford University. He became a professor at the University of Fribourg in 1955 and then successor to Nevanlinna at the University of Zurich in 1963.

Strebel founded the Nevanlinna Colloquium in Zürich (later also elsewhere) with another of Nevanlinna's former students, the professor Hans Künzi, to maintain contacts with Nevanlinna. The Nevanlinna Colloquium is usually held in Europe and covers most of classical complex analysis.

In 1977 Strebel was elected a member of the Finnish Academy of Sciences. He was an Invited Speaker at the ICM in 1974 in Vancouver.

He died on 26 October 2013 in Zürich. Named in his honor is the Strebel differential in the Teichmüller theory.

== Strebel differential ==
Definition A meromorphic quadratic differential is a Strebel differential if the union of its noncompact leaves forms a set of measure 0.

== Selected publications ==
=== Books ===
- Vorlesungen über Riemannsche Flächen, Vandenhoeck und Ruprecht, 1980.
- Quadratic Differentials. Ergebnisse der Mathematik und ihrer Grenzgebiete, Springer Verlag, 1984.

=== Articles ===
- On the maximal dilation of quasiconformal mappings. Proc. AMS, 6, 1955, 903–909. doi:10.1090/S0002-9939-1955-0073702-X
- Zur Frage der Eindeutigkeit extremaler quasikonformer Abbildungen des Einheitskreises. Comment. Math. Helv. 36, 1962, 306-323, Part 1 of article doi:10.1007/BF02566904, Comment. Math. Helv. 39, 1964, 77-89, Part 2 of article doi:10.1007/BF02566945
- Über quadratische Differentiale mit geschlossenen Trajektorien und extremale quasikonforme Abbildungen. in Festband zum 70. Geburtstag von Rolf Nevanlinna, Springer Verlag, 1966, 105–127. doi:10.1007/978-3-642-86699-9_13
- with Edgar Reich: On quasiconformal mappings which keep the boundary points fixed. Trans. Amer. Math. Soc. 138, 1969, 211–222. doi:10.1090/S0002-9947-1969-0237778-3
- with Edgar Reich: Extremal plane quasiconformal mappings with given boundary values. Bull. Amer. Math. Soc. 79, 1973, 488–490. doi:10.1090/S0002-9904-1973-13232-X
- with Edgar Reich: Extremal quasiconformal mappings with given boundary values. in Contributions to Analysis. A collection of papers dedicated to Lipman Bers. Academic Press, 1974, 375–391. doi:10.1016/B978-0-12-044850-0.50035-6
