= Nevanlinna invariant =

Mathematics

In mathematics, the Nevanlinna invariant of an ample divisor D on a normal projective variety X is a real number connected with the rate of growth of the number of rational points on the variety with respect to the embedding defined by the divisor. The concept is named after Rolf Nevanlinna.

== Formal definition ==
Formally, α(D) is the infimum of the rational numbers r such that $K_X + r D$ is in the closed real cone of effective divisors in the Néron–Severi group of X. If α is negative, then X is pseudo-canonical. It is expected that α(D) is always a rational number.

== Connection with height zeta function ==
The Nevanlinna invariant has similar formal properties to the abscissa of convergence of the height zeta function and it is conjectured that they are essentially the same. More precisely, Batyrev–Manin conjectured the following. Let X be a projective variety over a number field K with ample divisor D giving rise to an embedding and height function H, and let U denote a Xariski open subset of X. Let α = α(D) be the Nevanlinna invariant of D and β the abscissa of convergence of Z(U, H; s). Then for every ε > 0 there is a U such that β < α + ε: in the opposite direction, if α > 0 then α = β for all sufficiently large fields K and sufficiently small U.
