= Denjoy–Carleman–Ahlfors theorem =

The Denjoy–Carleman–Ahlfors theorem is a mathematical theorem that states that the number of asymptotic values attained by a non-constant entire function of order ρ on curves going outwards toward infinite absolute value is less than or equal to 2ρ. It was first conjectured by Arnaud Denjoy in 1907. Torsten Carleman showed that the number of asymptotic values was less than or equal to (5/2)ρ in 1921. In 1929 Lars Ahlfors confirmed Denjoy's conjecture of 2ρ. Finally, in 1933, Carleman published a very short proof.

The use of the term "asymptotic value" does not mean that the ratio of that value to the value of the function approaches 1 (as in asymptotic analysis) as one moves along a certain curve, but rather that the function value approaches the asymptotic value along the curve. For example, as one moves along the real axis toward negative infinity, the function $\exp(z)$ approaches zero, but the quotient $0/\exp(z)$ does not go to 1.

== Examples ==
The function $\exp(z)$ is of order 1 and has only one asymptotic value, namely 0. The same is true of the function $\sin(z)/z,$ but the asymptote is attained in two opposite directions.

A case where the number of asymptotic values is equal to 2ρ is the sine integral $\text{Si}(z)=\int_0^z\frac{\sin \zeta}{\zeta}\,d\zeta$, a function of order 1 which goes to −π/2 along the real axis going toward negative infinity, and to +π/2 in the opposite direction.

The integral of the function $a\sin(z^2)/z+b\sin(z^2)/z^2$ is an example of a function of order 2 with four asymptotic values (if b is not zero), approached as one goes outward from zero along the real and imaginary axes.

More generally, $f(z)=\int_0^z\frac{\sin(\zeta^\rho)}{\zeta^\rho}d\zeta,$ with ρ any positive integer, is of order ρ and has 2ρ asymptotic values.

It is clear that the theorem applies to polynomials only if they are not constant. A constant polynomial has 1 asymptotic value, but is of order 0.

== Generalized version ==
Lars Ahlfors later generalized the theorem, in his work on Ahlfors theory, which he published in 1935. The generalized theorem states that the number of asymptotic values of any meromorphic function, of the order p, is smaller than or equal to 2pR where R denotes the number of sheets of the associated Riemann surface.

A case where the number of asymptotic values is equal to 2ρR is the function $f(z) = \exp(z^p)$. Given $z^p$, the number of sheets of the associated Riemann surface is obviously equal to that of $f$.
