= Bounded type (mathematics) =

In mathematics, a function defined on a region of the complex plane is said to be of bounded type if it is equal to the ratio of two analytic functions bounded in that region. But more generally, a function is of bounded type in a region $\Omega$ if and only if $f$ is analytic on $\Omega$ and $\log^+|f(z)|$ has a harmonic majorant on $\Omega,$ where $\log^+(x)=\max[0,\log(x)]$. Being the ratio of two bounded analytic functions is a sufficient condition for a function to be of bounded type (defined in terms of a harmonic majorant), and if $\Omega$ is simply connected the condition is also necessary.

The class of all such $f$ on $\Omega$ is commonly denoted $N(\Omega)$ and is sometimes called the Nevanlinna class for $\Omega$. The Nevanlinna class includes all the Hardy classes.

Functions of bounded type are not necessarily bounded, nor do they have a property called "type" which is bounded. The reason for the name is probably that when defined on a disc, the Nevanlinna characteristic (a function of distance from the centre of the disc) is bounded.

Clearly, if a function is the ratio of two bounded functions, then it can be expressed as the ratio of two functions which are bounded by 1:

$$f(z)=P(z)/Q(z)$$

The logarithms of $|1/P(z)|$ and of $|1/Q(z)|$ are non-negative in the region, so

$$\begin{align}
\log|f(z)|
&=\log|1/Q(z)|-\log|1/P(z)|\\
&\le\log|1/Q(z)|
\end{align}$$

$$\begin{align}
\log^+|f(z)|
&=\max[0,\log|f(z)|]\\
&\le\max(0,\log|1/Q(z)|)\\
&\le\log|1/Q(z)|\\
&\le-\Re\left(\log Q(z)\right).
\end{align}$$

The latter is the real part of an analytic function and is therefore harmonic, showing that $\log^+|f(z)|$ has a harmonic majorant on Ω.

For a given region, sums, differences, and products of functions of bounded type are of bounded type, as is the quotient of two such functions as long as the denominator is not identically zero.

== Examples ==
Polynomials are of bounded type in any bounded region. They are also of bounded type in the upper half-plane (UHP), because a polynomial $f(z)$ of degree n can be expressed as a ratio of two analytic functions bounded in the UHP:

$$f(z)=P(z)/Q(z)$$

with

$$P(z)=f(z)/(z+i)^n$$

$$Q(z)=1/(z+i)^n.$$

The inverse of a polynomial is also of bounded type in a region, as is any rational function.

The function $\exp(aiz)$ is of bounded type in the UHP if and only if a is real. If a is positive the function itself is bounded in the UHP (so we can use $Q(z)=1$), and if a is negative then the function equals 1/Q(z) with $Q(z)=\exp(|a|iz)$.

Sine and cosine are of bounded type in the UHP. Indeed,

$$\sin(z)=P(z)/Q(z)$$

with

$$P(z)=\sin(z)\exp(iz)$$

$$Q(z)=\exp(iz)$$

both of which are bounded in the UHP.

All of the above examples are of bounded type in the lower half-plane as well, using different P and Q functions. But the region mentioned in the definition of the term "bounded type" cannot be the whole complex plane unless the function is constant because one must use the same P and Q over the whole region, and the only entire functions (that is, analytic in the whole complex plane) which are bounded are constants, by Liouville's theorem.

Another example in the upper half-plane is a "Nevanlinna function", that is, an analytic function that maps the UHP to the closed UHP. If f(z) is of this type, then

$$f(z)=P(z)/Q(z)$$

where P and Q are the bounded functions:

$$P(z)=\frac{f(z)}{f(z)+i}$$

$$Q(z)=\frac 1{f(z)+i}$$

(This obviously applies as well to $f(z)/i$, that is, a function whose real part is non-negative in the UHP.)

== Properties ==
For a given region, the sum, product, or quotient of two (non-null) functions of bounded type is also of bounded type. The set of functions of bounded type is an algebra over the complex numbers and is in fact a field.

Any function of bounded type in the upper half-plane (with a finite number of roots in some neighborhood of 0) can be expressed as a Blaschke product (an analytic function, bounded in the region, which factors out the zeros) multiplying the quotient $P(z)/Q(z)$ where $P(z)$ and $Q(z)$ are bounded by 1 and have no zeros in the UHP. One can then express this quotient as

$$P(z)/Q(z)=\exp(-U(z))/\exp(-V(z))$$

where $U(z)$ and $V(z)$ are analytic functions having non-negative real part in the UHP. Each of these in turn can be expressed by a Poisson representation (see Nevanlinna functions):

$$U(z)= c -ipz -i \int_{\mathbb{R}} \left(\frac{1}{\lambda - z} - \frac{\lambda}{1+\lambda^2} \right) d\mu(\lambda)$$

$$V(z)= d -iqz -i \int_{\mathbb{R}} \left(\frac{1}{\lambda - z} - \frac{\lambda}{1+\lambda^2} \right) d\nu(\lambda)$$

where c and d are imaginary constants, p and q are non-negative real constants, and μ and ν are non-decreasing functions of a real variable (well behaved so the integrals converge). The difference q−p has been given the name "mean type" by Louis de Branges and describes the growth or decay of the function along the imaginary axis:

$$q-p=\limsup_{y\to\infty}y^{-1}\ln|f(iy)|$$

The mean type in the upper half-plane is the limit of a weighted average of the logarithm of the function's absolute value divided by distance from zero, normalized in such a way that the value for $\exp(-iz)$ is 1:

$$q-p=\lim_{r\to\infty}(2/\pi)r^{-1}\int_0^\pi\ln|f(re^{i\theta})|\sin\theta d\theta$$

If an entire function is of bounded type in both the upper and the lower half-plane then it is of exponential type equal to the higher of the two respective "mean types" (and the higher one will be non-negative). An entire function of order greater than 1 (which means that in some direction it grows faster than a function of exponential type) cannot be of bounded type in any half-plane.

We may thus produce a function of bounded type by using an appropriate exponential of z and exponentials of arbitrary Nevanlinna functions multiplied by i, for example:

$$f(z)=\exp(iz)\frac{\exp(i\sqrt{z})}{\exp(-i/\sqrt{z})}$$

Concerning the examples given above, the mean type of polynomials or their inverses is zero. The mean type of $\exp(aiz)$ in the upper half-plane is −a, while in the lower half-plane it is a. The mean type of $\sin(z)$ in both half-planes is 1.

Functions of bounded type in the upper half-plane with non-positive mean type and having a continuous, square-integrable extension to the real axis have the interesting property (useful in applications) that the integral (along the real axis)

$$\frac 1{2\pi i}\int_{-\infty}^\infty\frac{f(t)dt}{t-z}$$

equals $f(z)$ if z is in the upper half-plane and zero if z is in the lower half-plane. This may be termed the Cauchy formula for the upper half-plane.

== See also ==
- De Branges space
- Rolf Nevanlinna
