= Rolf Nevanlinna =

Finnish mathematician (1895–1980)

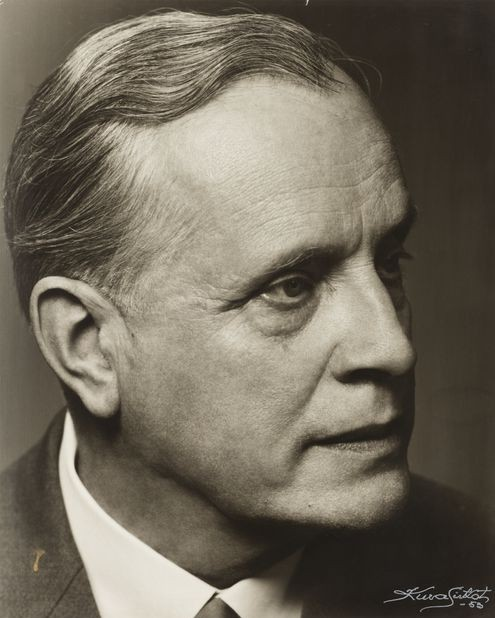
- Rolf Nevanlinna, 1958.
- Born: Rolf Herman Neovius; 22 October 1895; Joensuu, Grand Duchy of Finland, Russian Empire
- Died: 28 May 1980 (aged 84); Helsinki, Finland
- Education: University of Helsinki
- Known for: Nevanlinna theory
- Scientific career
- Fields: Mathematics
- Thesis: Über beschränkte Funktionen die in gegebenen Punkten vorgeschriebene Werte annehmen (1919)
- Doctoral advisor: Ernst Leonard Lindelöf
- Doctoral students: Lars Ahlfors, Kari Karhunen, Leo Sario, Gustav Elfving, Olli Lehto, Kurt Strebel, Olli Lokki, Nazım Terzioğlu

Rolf Herman Nevanlinna (né Neovius; 22 October 1895 – 28 May 1980) was a Finnish mathematician who made significant contributions to complex analysis. He is the namesake of Nevanlinna theory for meromorphic functions.

== Background ==
Nevanlinna was born Rolf Herman Neovius, becoming Nevanlinna in 1906 when his father changed the family name.

The Neovius-Nevanlinna family contained many mathematicians: Edvard Engelbert Neovius (Rolf's grandfather) taught mathematics and topography at a military academy; Edvard Rudolf Neovius (an uncle of Rolf's) was a professor of mathematics at the University of Helsinki from 1883 to 1900; Lars Theodor Neovius-Nevanlinna (another uncle of Rolf's) was an author of mathematical textbooks; and Otto Wilhelm Neovius-Nevanlinna (Rolf's father) was a physicist, astronomer and mathematician.

After Otto obtained his Ph.D. in physics from the University of Helsinki, he studied at the Pulkovo Observatory with the German astronomer Herman Romberg, whose daughter, Margarete Henriette Louise Romberg, he married in 1892. Otto and Margarete then settled in Joensuu, where Otto taught physics, and there their four children were born: Frithiof (born 1894; also a mathematician), Rolf (born 1895), Anna (born 1896) and Erik (born 1901).

== Education ==
Nevanlinna began his formal education at the age of 7. Having already been taught to read and write by his parents, he went straight into the second grade but still found the work boring and soon refused to attend the school. He was then homeschooled before being sent to a grammar school in 1903 when the family moved to Helsinki, where his father took up a new post as a teacher at Helsinki High School. At the new school, Nevanlinna studied French and German in addition to the languages he already spoke: Finnish and Swedish. He also attended an orchestra school and had a love of music, which was encouraged by his mother:

Margarete was an excellent pianist and Frithiof and Rolf would lie under the piano and listen to her playing. At 13 they went to orchestra school and became accomplished musicians – Frithiof on the cello and Rolf on the violin. Through free tickets from the orchestra school they got to know and love the music of the great composers, Bach, Beethoven, Brahms, Schubert, Schumann, Chopin and Liszt, as well as the early symphonies of Sibelius. Rolf first met Sibelius's music in 1907, when he heard his Third Symphony. Although later he met Hilbert, Einstein, Thomas Mann and other famous people, Rolf said that none had had such a strong effect on him as Sibelius. The boys played trios with their mother and their love of music – in particular of chamber music – lasted all their lives.

Nevanlinna then progressed onto the Helsinki High School, where his main interests were classics and mathematics. He was taught by a number of teachers during this time but the best of them all was his own father, who taught him physics and mathematics. He graduated in 1913 having performed very well, although he was not the top student of his year. He then went beyond the school syllabus in the summer of 1913 when he read Ernst Leonard Lindelöf's Introduction to Higher Analysis; from that time on, Nevanlinna had an enthusiastic interest in mathematical analysis. (Lindelöf was also a cousin of Nevanlinna's father, and so a part of the Neovius-Nevanlinna mathematical family.)

Nevanlinna began his studies at the University of Helsinki in 1913, and received his Master of Philosophy in mathematics in 1917. Lindelöf taught at the university and Nevanlinna was further influenced by him. During his time at the University of Helsinki, World War I was underway and Nevanlinna wanted to join the 27th Jäger Battalion, but his father stopped him, arguing that he would serve his country better as an academic than as a soldier. He did however join the White Guard in the Finnish Civil War, but did not see active military action. In 1919, Nevanlinna presented his thesis, entitled Über beschränkte Funktionen die in gegebenen Punkten vorgeschriebene Werte annehmen ("On limited functions prescribed values at given points"), to Lindelöf, his doctoral advisor. The thesis, which was on complex analysis, was of high quality and Nevanlinna was awarded his Doctor of Philosophy on 2 June 1919.

== Career ==
When Nevanlinna earned his doctorate in 1919, there were no university posts available so he became a school teacher. His brother, Frithiof, had received his doctorate in 1918 but likewise was unable to take up a post at a university, and instead began working as a mathematician for an insurance company. Frithiof recruited Rolf to the company, the insurance firm Salama (later Pohjola Insurance), and Nevanlinna worked approximately twenty hours a week teaching mathematics at a secondary school while simultaneously working as a mathematician for the insurance company, until he was appointed a Docent of Mathematics at the University of Helsinki in 1922. During this time, he had been contacted by Edmund Landau and requested to move to Germany to work at the University of Göttingen, but did not accept.

After his appointment as Docent of Mathematics, he gave up his insurance job but did not resign his position as school teacher until he received a newly created full professorship at the university in 1926. Despite this heavy workload, it was between the years of 1922–25 that he developed what would become to be known as Nevanlinna theory.

Rolf Nevanlinna's most important mathematical achievement is the value distribution theory of meromorphic functions. The roots of the theory go back to the result of Émile Picard in 1879, showing that a non-constant complex-valued function which is analytic in the entire complex plane assumes all complex values save at most one. In the early 1920s Rolf Nevanlinna, partly in collaboration with his brother Frithiof, extended the theory to cover meromorphic functions, i.e. functions analytic in the plane except for isolated points in which the Laurent series of the function has a finite number of terms with a negative power of the variable. Nevanlinna's value distribution theory or Nevanlinna theory is crystallised in its two Main Theorems. Qualitatively, the first one states that if a value is assumed less frequently than average, then the function comes close to that value more often than average. The Second Main Theorem, more difficult than the first one, states roughly that there are relatively few values which the function assumes less often than average.

Rolf Nevanlinna's article Zur Theorie der meromorphen Funktionen which contains the Main Theorems was published in 1925 in the journal Acta Mathematica. Hermann Weyl has called it "one of the few great mathematical events of the [twentieth] century." Nevanlinna gave a fuller account of the theory in the monographs Le théoreme de Picard – Borel et la théorie des fonctions méromorphes (1929) and Eindeutige analytische Funktionen (1936).

Nevanlinna theory touches also on a class of functions called the Nevanlinna class, or functions of "bounded type".

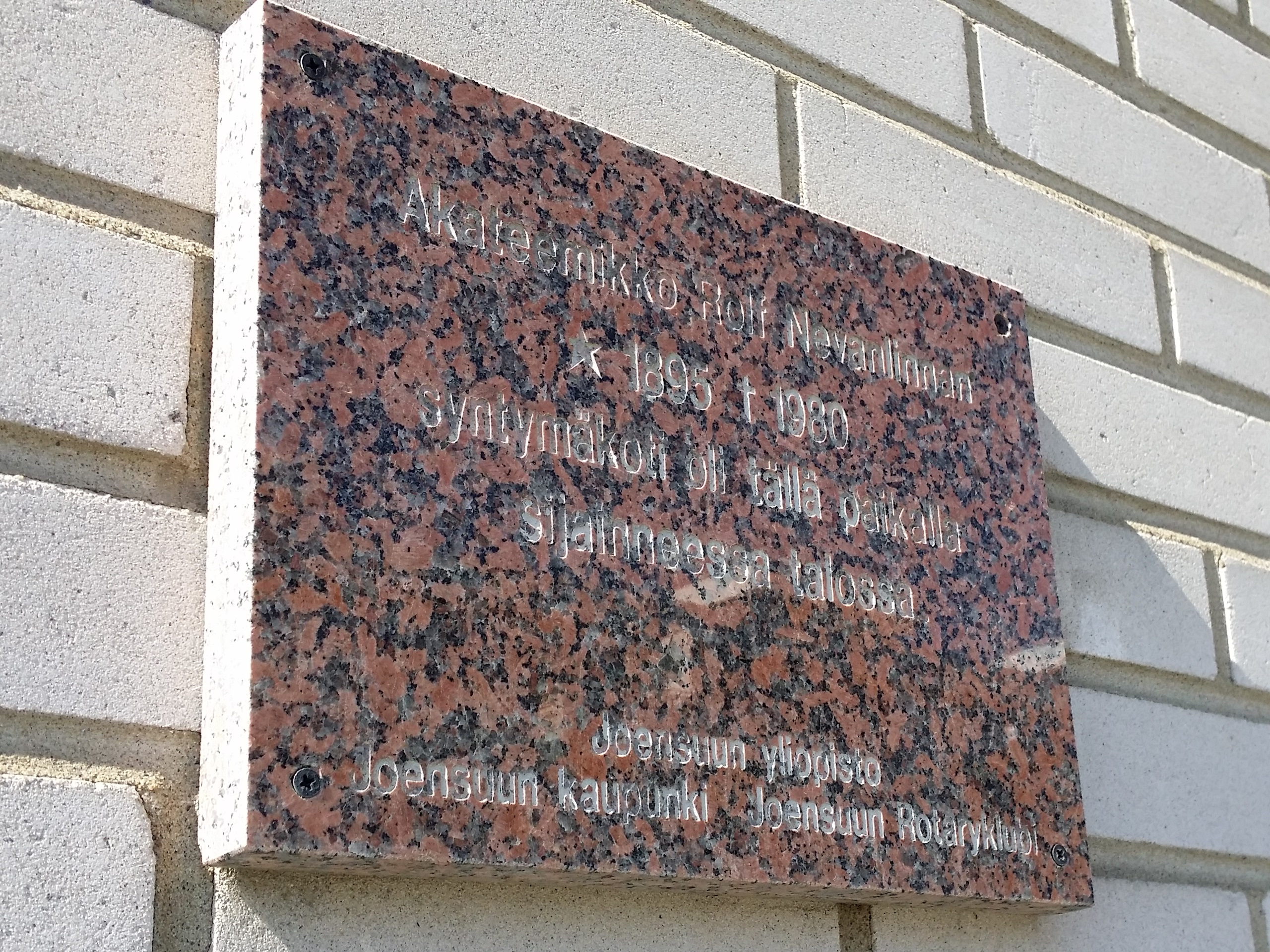
Memorial plaque of Rolf Nevanlinna's birth home, Koulukatu 25, Joensuu, Finland. “Academician Rolf Nevanlinna's (1895–1980) birth home was in a house located here.”

When the Winter War broke out (1939), Nevanlinna was invited to join the Finnish Army's Ballistics Office to assist in improving artillery firing tables. These tables had been based on a calculation technique developed by General Vilho Petter Nenonen, but Nevanlinna now came up with a new method which made them considerably faster to compile. In recognition of his work he was awarded the Order of the Cross of Liberty, Second Class, and throughout his life he held this honour in especial esteem.

From 1947 Nevanlinna had a chair in the University of Zurich, which he held on a half-time basis after receiving in 1948 a permanent position as one of the 12 salaried Academicians in the newly created Academy of Finland.

Among Rolf Nevanlinna's later interests in mathematics were the theory of Riemann surfaces (the monograph Uniformisierung in 1953) and functional analysis (Absolute analysis in 1959, written in collaboration with his brother Frithiof). Nevanlinna also published in Finnish a book on the foundations of geometry and a semipopular account of the Theory of Relativity. His Finnish textbook on the elements of complex analysis, Funktioteoria (1963), written together with Veikko Paatero, has appeared in German, English and Russian translations.

Rolf Nevanlinna supervised at least 28 doctoral theses. His first and most famous doctoral student was Lars Ahlfors, one of the first two Fields Medal recipients. The research for which Ahlfors was awarded the prize (proving the Denjoy Conjecture, now known as the Denjoy–Carleman–Ahlfors theorem) was strongly based on Nevanlinna's work.

Nevanlinna's work was recognised in the form of honorary degrees which he held from several universities: the University of Heidelberg, the University of Bucharest, the University of Giessen, the Free University of Berlin, the University of Glasgow, the University of Uppsala, the University of Istanbul and the University of Jyväskylä. He was an honorary member of several learned societies, among them the London Mathematical Society and the Hungarian Academy of Sciences. The 1679 Nevanlinna main belt asteroid is named after him.

== Administrative activities ==
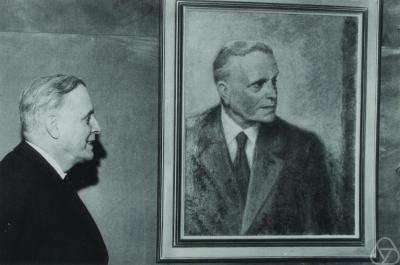
Nevanlinna and his portrait.

From 1954, Rolf Nevanlinna chaired the committee which set about the first computer project in Finland.

Rolf Nevanlinna served as President of the International Mathematical Union (IMU) from 1959 to 1963 and as President of the International Congress of Mathematicians (ICM) in 1962 in Stockholm. He also served as chairman of the committee responsible for the scientific programme at the congress in Moscow in 1966. In 1956, Nevanlinna was elected a foreign member of the Royal Swedish Academy of Sciences.

In 1964, Nevanlinna's connections with President Urho Kekkonen were instrumental in bringing about a total reorganization of the Academy of Finland.

From 1965 to 1970 Nevanlinna was Chancellor of the University of Turku.

He served as chairman of the board of the Sibelius Academy from 1941 to 1945 and again from 1964 to 1972.

== Political activities ==
Although Nevanlinna did not participate actively in politics, he was known to sympathise with the right-wing Patriotic People's Movement and, partly because of his half-German parentage, was also sympathetic towards Nazi Germany; with many mathematics professors fired in the 1930s due to the Nuremberg Laws, mathematicians sympathetic to the Nazi policies were sought as replacements, and Nevanlinna accepted a position as professor at the University of Göttingen in 1936 and 1937. Nevanlinna was elected Rector of the University of Helsinki in 1941, defeating Edwin Linkomies by 35 votes to 29.

After the war, pressure mounted on Nevanlinna to resign his position as Rector. He initially disregarded these pressures until Prime Minister Juho Kusti Paasikivi personally urged him to resign, citing the public interest. Nevanlinna thereupon decided to leave Finland as soon as possible and moved to Zurich to take up a professorship. When the Academy of Finland was established in 1948, Paasikivi appointed Nevanlinna as one of its members, explaining that Nevanlinna's earlier conduct had been in accordance with the official policy of the time.

In the spring of 1941, Finland contributed a Volunteer Battalion to the Waffen-SS. In 1942, a committee was established for the Volunteer Battalion to take care of the battalion's somewhat strained relations with its German commanders, and Nevanlinna was chosen to be the chairman of the committee, as he was a person respected in Germany but loyal to Finland. He stated in his autobiography that he accepted this role due to a "sense of duty".

Nevanlinna's collaboration with Nazi Germany did not prevent mathematical contacts with Allied countries; after World War II, the Soviet mathematical community was isolated from the Western mathematical community and the International Colloquium on Function Theory in Helsinki in 1957, directed by Nevanlinna, was one of the first post-war occasions when Soviet mathematicians could contact their Western colleagues in person. In 1965, Nevanlinna was an honorary guest at a function theory congress in Soviet Armenia.

== IMU Abacus Medal (formerly Nevanlinna Prize) ==
When the IMU in 1981 decided to create a prize, similar to the Fields Medal, in theoretical computer science and the funding for the prize was secured from Finland, the Union decided to give Nevanlinna's name to the prize; the Rolf Nevanlinna Prize was awarded every four years at the ICM. In 2018, the General Assembly of the IMU approved a resolution to remove Nevanlinna's name from the prize. Starting in 2022 the prize has been called the IMU Abacus Medal.

== Personal life ==
Immediately after receiving his doctorate, Nevanlinna married his cousin Mary Elise Selin. The marriage ended in divorce, and in 1958 he married the author Sinikka Kallio-Visapää. Beyond mathematics, Nevanlinna was an accomplished violinist with a deep interest in the music of Jean Sibelius.

== See also ==
- Harmonic measure
- Nevanlinna theory
- Nevanlinna class (functions of bounded type)
- Nevanlinna function
- Nevanlinna invariant
- Nevanlinna–Pick interpolation
- Nevanlinna's criterion
- Nevanlinna Prize

== Sources ==
- Lehto, Olli (2008). Erhabene Welten: Das Leben Rolf Nevanlinnas [High Worlds: The life of Rolf Nevanlinna] (in German). Translated by Manfred Stern. Birkhäuser. ISBN 978-3-7643-7701-4.
