= Frithiof Nevanlinna =

Finnish mathematician (1894–1977)

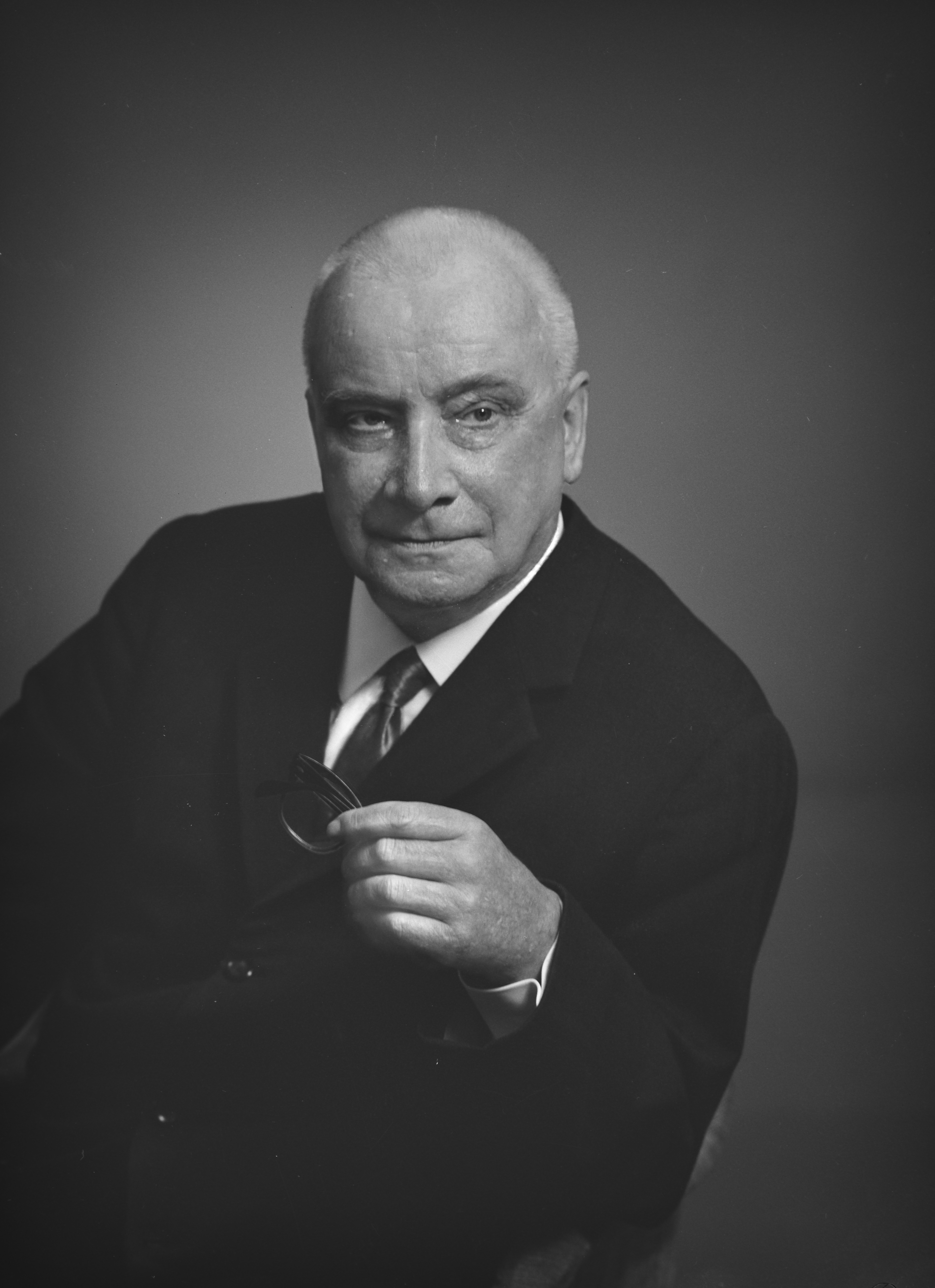
Frithiof Nevanlinna in 1964.

Frithiof Edvard Henrik Nevanlinna (16 August 1894 – 20 March 1977) was a Finnish mathematician and professor who worked on classical and complex analysis. He was born in Joensuu, and was the older brother of mathematician Rolf Nevanlinna.

== Publications ==
- Nevanlinna, F.; Nevanlinna, Rolf (1959), Absolute analysis, Die Grundlehren der mathematischen Wissenschaften in Einzeldarstellungen mit besonderer Berücksichtigung der Anwendungsgebiete, vol. 102, Berlin, New York: Springer-Verlag, MR 0121438
