= Nevanlinna function =

Complex analysis function

In mathematics, in the field of complex analysis, a Nevanlinna function is a complex function which is an analytic function on the open upper half-plane $\, \mathcal{H} \,$ and has a non-negative imaginary part. A Nevanlinna function maps the upper half-plane to itself or a real constant, but is not necessarily injective or surjective. Functions with this property are sometimes also known as Herglotz, Pick or R functions.

== Integral representation ==
Every Nevanlinna function N admits a representation

$$N(z) = C + D z + \int_{\mathbb{R}} \bigg(\frac{1}{\lambda - z} - \frac{\lambda}{1 + \lambda^2} \bigg) \operatorname{d} \mu(\lambda), \quad z \in \mathcal{H},$$

where C is a real constant, D is a non-negative constant, $\mathcal{H}$ is the upper half-plane, and μ is a Borel measure on ℝ satisfying the growth condition

$$\int_{\mathbb{R}} \frac{\operatorname{d} \mu(\lambda)}{1 + \lambda^2} < \infty.$$

Conversely, every function of this form turns out to be a Nevanlinna function. The constants in this representation are related to the function N via

$$C = \Re \big( N(i) \big) \qquad \text{ and } \qquad D = \lim_{y \rightarrow \infty} \frac{N(i y)}{i y}$$

and the Borel measure μ can be recovered from N by employing the Stieltjes inversion formula (related to the inversion formula for the Stieltjes transformation):

$$\mu \big( (\lambda_1, \lambda_2 ] \big) =
\lim_{\delta\rightarrow 0} \lim_{\varepsilon\rightarrow 0}
\frac{1}{\pi} \int_{\lambda_1+\delta}^{\lambda_2+\delta} \Im \big( N(\lambda + i \varepsilon) \big) \operatorname{d} \lambda.$$

A very similar representation of functions is also called the Poisson representation.

== Examples ==
Some elementary examples of Nevanlinna functions follow (with appropriately chosen branch cuts in the first three). ($z$ can be replaced by $z - a$ for any real number $a$.)

- $z^p\text{ with } 0 \le p \le 1$
- $-z^p\text{ with } -1 \le p \le 0$

These are injective but when p does not equal 1 or −1 they are not surjective and can be rotated to some extent around the origin, such as $i(z/i)^p ~\text{ with }~-1\le p\le 1$.

- A sheet of $\ln(z)$ such as the one with $f(1)=0$.
- $\tan(z)$ (an example that is surjective but not injective).
- A Möbius transformation

$$z \mapsto  \frac{az+b}{cz+d}$$

is a Nevanlinna function if (sufficient but not necessary) $\overline{a} d - b \overline{c}$ is a positive real number and $\Im (\overline{b} d ) = \Im (\overline{a} c) = 0$. This is equivalent to the set of such transformations that map the real axis to itself. One may then add any constant in the upper half-plane, and move the pole into the lower half-plane, giving new values for the parameters. Example: $\frac{i z + i - 2}{z + 1 + i}$

- $1 + i + z$ and $i + \operatorname{e}^{i z}$ are examples which are entire functions. The second is neither injective nor surjective.
- If S is a self-adjoint operator in a Hilbert space and $f$ is an arbitrary vector, then the function

$$\langle (S-z)^{-1} f, f \rangle$$

is a Nevanlinna function.

- If $M(z)$ and $N(z)$ are both Nevanlinna functions, then the composition $M \big( N(z) \big)$ is a Nevanlinna function as well.

== Importance in operator theory ==
Nevanlinna functions appear in the study of Operator monotone functions.
