= British Mathematical Olympiad =

British annual mathematics competition

The British Mathematical Olympiad (BMO) forms part of the selection process for the UK International Mathematical Olympiad team and for other international maths competitions, including the European Girls' Mathematical Olympiad, the Romanian Master of Mathematics and Sciences, and the Balkan Mathematical Olympiad. It is organised by the British Mathematical Olympiad Subtrust, which is part of the United Kingdom Mathematics Trust. There are two rounds, the BMO1 and the BMO2.

== BMO Round 1 ==
The first round of the BMO is held in November each year, and from 2006 is an open entry competition. The qualification to BMO Round 1 is through the Senior Mathematical Challenge or the Mathematical Olympiad for Girls. Students who do not make the qualification may be entered at the discretion of their school for a fee of £40.

The paper lasts 3½ hours, and consists of six questions (from 2005), each worth 10 marks. The exam in the 2020-2021 cycle was adjusted to consist of two sections, first section with 4 questions each worth 5 marks (only answers required), and second section with 3 question each worth 10 marks (full solutions required). The duration of the exam had been reduced to 2½ hours, due to the difficulties of holding a 3½ hours exam under COVID-19.

Candidates are required to write full proofs to the questions. An answer is marked on either a "0+" or a "10-" mark scheme, depending on whether the answer looks generally complete or not. An answer judged incomplete or unfinished is usually capped at 3 or 4, whereas for an answer judged as complete, marks may be deducted for minor errors or poor reasoning but it is likely to get a score of 7 or more. As a result, it is uncommon for an answer to score a middling mark between 4 and 6.

While around 1000 gain automatic qualification to sit the BMO1 paper each year, the additional discretionary and international student entries mean that since 2016, on average, around 1600 candidates have been entered for BMO1 each year. Although these candidates represent the very best mathematicians in their age group, the difficulty level of the BMO papers mean that many of these attain a very low score.

The scores were particularly low until 2004, for example, when the median score was approximately 5-6 (out of 50). In 2005, UKMT changed the system and added an extra easier question meaning the median is now raised. In 2008, 23 students scored more than 40/60 and around 50 got over 30/60.

In addition to the British students, until 2018, there was a history of about 20 students from New Zealand being invited to take part. In recent years, entries to BMO have been made from schools in Ireland, Kazakhstan, India, China, South Korea, Hong Kong, Singapore, and Thailand.

BMO1 paper for the cycle 2021-22 attracted 1857 entries. Only 5 candidates scored 90% or more. A score of 21/60 was enough to earn a Distinction, awarded to top 26% of the candidates.

From the results of the BMO1, around 100 top scoring students are invited to sit the BMO2. For the 2021-22 cycle, the score needed for to qualify for BMO2 was 33 for a year 13 pupil and 29 for a pupil in year 10 and below. Students who did not take the BMO1, or who did not qualify for an invitation, may be entered into the next round at the discretion of their school through payment of a fee of £50.

Typically, around top 20 scoring students in BMO1 feature on what is known as the BMO leaderboard.

== BMO Round 2 ==
BMO2 (known as the Further International Selection Test, FIST from 1972 to 1991) is normally held in late January or early February, and is significantly more difficult than BMO1. BMO2 also lasts 3½ hours, but consists of only four questions, each worth 10 marks. Like the BMO1 paper, it is not designed merely to test knowledge of advanced mathematics but rather to test the candidate's ability to apply the mathematical knowledge to solve unusual problems and is an entry point to training and selection for the international competitions.

BMO2 paper for the cycle 2021-22 attracted over 200 entries. A score of 17/40 was enough to earn a Distinction, awarded to top 25% of the candidates. Only 4 candidates scored more than 30/40.

Twenty-four of the top scorers from BMO2 are subsequently invited to the training camp at Trinity College, Cambridge for the first stage of the IMO UK team selection.

The top 4 female scorers from BMO2 are selected to represent the UK at the European Girls' Mathematical Olympiad.

== IMO Selection Papers ==
For more information about IMO selection in other countries, see International Mathematical Olympiad selection process

Since 1985, further selection tests have been used after BMO2 to select the IMO team. (The team was selected following the single BMO paper from 1967 to 1971, then following the FIST paper for some years from 1972.) Initially these third-stage tests resulted in selection of both team and reserve; from 1993 a squad (team plus reserve) was selected following these tests with the team being separated from the reserve after further correspondence training, and after further selection tests from 2001 onwards. The third-stage tests have had names including FIST 2 (1985), Second International Selection Test (SIST), Reading Selection Test (1987), Final Selection Test (FST, 1992 to 2001) and First Selection Test (FST, from 2002); the fourth-stage tests have been Team Selection Test (TST, 2001) and Next Selection Test (NST, 2002 onwards). These tests have been held at training and selection camps in several locations, recently Trinity College, Cambridge and Oundle School.

Since 2017, the tests are simply called Team Selection Tests (TSTs). Six TSTs were held in 2017 and 2018. Since 2019, the number of TSTs have been reduced to 4 or two rounds, the first round is held in late April and the second round is usually in late May. The UK IMO squad of 10 is selected following the first round of tests with the final team of 6 to represent the UK at the International Mathematical Olympiad announced following the second round.

In 2025, the first round of TSTs was held on 3-8 April and the second round on 3–5 May. The UK squad for IMO 2025 was Alex Chui, Aanya Goyal, Adavya Goyal, Samuel Griffiths, Zijie Guan and Teri Xu, with Will Harwood being the first reserve. The team achieved three gold, one silver and two bronze medals.

== See also ==
- International Mathematical Olympiad
- United Kingdom Mathematics Trust
