= Grunsky's theorem =

In mathematics, Grunsky's theorem, due to the German mathematician Helmut Grunsky, is a result in complex analysis concerning holomorphic univalent functions defined on the unit disk in the complex numbers. The theorem states that a univalent function defined on the unit disc, fixing the point 0, maps every disk |z| < r onto a starlike domain for r ≤ tanh π/4.

The radius of starlikeness of an univalent function f satisfying f(0) = 0 is the largest radius r for which the function f maps the open disk |z| < r into a starlike domain with respect to the origin.

== Statement ==
Let f be a univalent holomorphic function on the unit disc D such that f(0) = 0. Then for all r ≤ tanh π/4, the image of the disc |z| < r is starlike with respect to 0, i.e. it is closed under multiplication by real numbers in (0,1).

== An inequality of Grunsky ==
If f(z) is univalent on D with f(0) = 0, then

$$\left|\log {zf^\prime(z)\over f(z)}\right|\le \log {1+|z|\over 1-|z|}.$$

Taking the real and imaginary parts of the logarithm, this implies the two inequalities

$$\left|{zf^\prime(z)\over f(z)}\right|\le {1+|z|\over 1-|z|}$$

and

$$\left|\arg {zf^\prime(z)\over f(z)}\right| \le \log {1+|z|\over 1-|z|}.$$

For fixed z, both these equalities are attained by suitable Koebe functions

$$g_w(\zeta)={\zeta\over (1-\overline{w}\zeta)^2},$$

where |w| = 1.

=== Proof ===
Grunsky (1932) originally proved these inequalities based on extremal techniques of Ludwig Bieberbach. Subsequent proofs, outlined in Goluzin (1939), relied on the Loewner equation. More elementary proofs were subsequently given based on Goluzin's inequalities, an equivalent form of Grunsky's inequalities (1939) for the Grunsky matrix.

For a univalent function g in z > 1 with an expansion

$$g(z) = z + b_1 z^{-1} + b_2 z^{-2} + \cdots.$$

Goluzin's inequalities state that

$$\left|\sum_{i=1}^n\sum_{j=1}^n\lambda_i\lambda_j \log {g(z_i)-g(z_j)\over z_i-z_j}\right| \le \sum_{i=1}^n\sum_{j=1}^n \lambda_i\overline{\lambda_j}\log {z_i\overline{z_j}\over z_i\overline{z_j}-1},$$

where the z_{i} are distinct points with |z_{i}| > 1 and λ_{i} are arbitrary complex numbers.

Taking n = 2. with λ_{1} = – λ_{2} = λ, the inequality implies

$$\left| \log {g^\prime(\zeta)g^\prime(\eta) (\zeta-\eta)^2\over (g(\zeta)-g(\eta))^2}\right|\le \log {|1-\zeta\overline{\eta}|^2\over (|\zeta|^2 -1 )(|\eta|^2 -1)}.$$

If g is an odd function and η = – ζ, this yields

$$\left| \log {\zeta g^\prime(\zeta) \over g(\zeta)}\right| \le {|\zeta|^2 + 1\over |\zeta|^2 -1}.$$

Finally if f is any normalized univalent function in D, the required inequality for f follows by taking

$$g(\zeta)=f(\zeta^{-2})^{-{1\over 2}}$$

with $z=\zeta^{-2}.$

== Proof of the theorem ==
Let f be a univalent function on D with f(0) = 0. By Nevanlinna's criterion, f is starlike on |z| < r if and only if

$$\Re {zf^\prime(z)\over f(z)} \ge 0$$

for |z| < r. Equivalently

$$\left|\arg {zf^\prime(z)\over f(z)}\right| \le {\pi\over 2}.$$

On the other hand, by the inequality of Grunsky above,

$$\left|\arg {zf^\prime(z)\over f(z)}\right|\le \log {1+|z|\over 1-|z|}.$$

Thus if

$$\log {1+|z|\over 1-|z|} \le  {\pi\over 2},$$

the inequality holds at z. This condition is equivalent to

$$|z|\le \tanh {\pi\over 4}$$

and hence f is starlike on any disk |z| < r with r ≤ tanh π/4.
