= Grunsky matrix =

Matrix used in complex analysis

In complex analysis and geometric function theory, the Grunsky matrices, or Grunsky operators, are infinite matrices introduced in 1939 by Helmut Grunsky. The matrices correspond to either a single holomorphic function on the unit disk or a pair of holomorphic functions on the unit disk and its complement. The Grunsky inequalities express boundedness properties of these matrices, which in general are contraction operators or in important special cases unitary operators. As Grunsky showed, these inequalities hold if and only if the holomorphic function is univalent. The inequalities are equivalent to the inequalities of Goluzin, discovered in 1947. Roughly speaking, the Grunsky inequalities give information on the coefficients of the logarithm of a univalent function; later generalizations by Milin, starting from the Lebedev–Milin inequality, succeeded in exponentiating the inequalities to obtain inequalities for the coefficients of the univalent function itself. The Grunsky matrix and its associated inequalities were originally formulated in a more general setting of univalent functions between a region bounded by finitely many sufficiently smooth Jordan curves and its complement: the results of Grunsky, Goluzin and Milin generalize to that case.

Historically the inequalities for the disk were used in proving special cases of the Bieberbach conjecture up to the sixth coefficient; the exponentiated inequalities of Milin were used by de Branges in the final solution. A detailed exposition using these methods can be found in Hayman (1994). The Grunsky operators and their Fredholm determinants are also related to spectral properties of bounded domains in the complex plane. The operators have further applications in conformal mapping, Teichmüller theory and conformal field theory.

== Grunsky Matrix ==
If f(z) is a holomorphic univalent function on the unit disk, normalized so that f(0) = 0 and f′(0) = 1, the function

$$g(z) = f(z^{-1})^{-1}$$

is a non-vanishing univalent function on |z| > 1 having a simple pole at ∞ with residue 1:

$$g(z) = z + b_0 + b_1z^{-1} + b_2 z^{-2} + \cdots$$

The same inversion formula applied to g gives back f and establishes a one-one correspondence between these two classes of function.

The Grunsky matrix (c_{nm}) of g is defined by the equation

$$\log\frac{g(z)-g(\zeta)}{z-\zeta} = -\sum_{m,n>0}c_{nm}z^{-m}\zeta^{-n}$$

It is a symmetric matrix. Its entries are called the Grunsky coefficients of g.

Note that

$$\log{g(z^{-1})-g(\zeta^{-1})\over z^{-1}-\zeta^{-1}} = \log{f(z)-f(\zeta)\over z -\zeta} -\log {f(z)\over z} -\log {f(\zeta)\over \zeta},$$

so that the coefficients can be expressed directly in terms of f. Indeed, if

$$\log{f(z)-f(\zeta)\over z -\zeta} = -\sum_{m,n\ge 0} d_{mn} z^n \zeta^n,$$

then for m, n > 0

$$d_{mn} = c_{mn}$$

and d_{0n} = d_{n0} is given by

$$\log \frac{f(z)}{z} = \sum_{n>0} d_{0n} z^n$$

with

$$d_{00}=0.$$

== Grunsky inequalities ==
If f is a holomorphic function on the unit disk with Grunsky matrix (c_{nm}), the Grunsky inequalities state that

$$\left|\sum_{1\le m,n \le N} c_{mn}\lambda_m \lambda_n \right|\le \sum_{1\le n\le N} \frac{|\lambda_n|^2}{n}$$

for any finite sequence of complex numbers λ_{1}, ..., λ_{N}.

== Faber polynomials ==
The Grunsky coefficients of a normalized univalent function in |z| > 1

$$g(z)=z+b_0 + b_1z^{-1} + b_2 z^{-2} + \cdots$$

are polynomials in the coefficients b_{i} which can be computed recursively in terms of the Faber polynomials Φ_{n}, a monic polynomial of degree n depending on g.

Taking the derivative in z of the defining relation of the Grunsky coefficients and multiplying by z gives

$$\frac{z g'(z)}{g(z) -g(\zeta)} - \frac{z}{z-\zeta} = \sum_{m,n>0} m c_{mn} z^{-m} \zeta^{-n}.$$

The Faber polynomials are defined by the relation

$$\frac{z g'(z)}{g(z)-w}=\sum_{n\ge 0} \Phi_n(w) z^{-n}.$$

Dividing this relation by z and integrating between z and ∞ gives

$$\log \frac{g(z)-w}{z} =-\sum_{n\ge 1}{1\over n}\Phi_n(w) z^{-n}.$$

This gives the recurrence relations for n > 0

$$\Phi_n(w)= (w-b_0) \Phi_{n-1}(w) -nb_n -\sum_{0\le i \le n-1} b_{n-i} \Phi_{i}(w)$$

with

$$\Phi_0(w)\equiv 1.$$

Thus

$$\sum_{n\ge 0} \Phi_n(g(z))\zeta^{-n} =1+\sum_{n\ge 1} \left(z^n +\sum_{m\ge 1} c_{nm}z^{-m}\right)\zeta^{-n},$$

so that for n ≥ 1

$$\Phi_n(g(z))=z^n + \sum_{m\ge 1} c_{nm}z^{-m}.$$

The latter property uniquely determines the Faber polynomial of g.

== Milin's area theorem ==
Let g(z) be a univalent function on |z| > 1 normalized so that

$$g(z) = z + b_1 z^{-1} + b_2 z^{-2} + \cdots$$

and let f(z) be a non-constant holomorphic function on C.

If

$$f(g(z))=\sum_{-\infty}^\infty c_n z^n$$

is the Laurent expansion on z > 1, then

$$\sum_{n>0} n|c_n|^2 \le \sum_{n>0} n|c_{-n}|^2.$$

=== Proof ===
If Ω is a bounded open region with smooth boundary ∂Ω and h is a differentiable function on Ω extending to a continuous function on the closure, then, by Stokes' theorem applied to the differential 1-form $\omega = h(z) dz,$

$$\int_{\partial \Omega} h(z) \, dz = \int_{\partial \Omega} \omega = \iint_\Omega d\omega = \iint_\Omega (i\partial_x-\partial_y)h \, dx \, dy= 2i \iint_\Omega \partial_{\overline{z}} h \,dx \, dy.$$

For r > 1, let Ω_{r} be the complement of the image of |z|> r under g(z), a bounded domain. Then, by the above identity with h = f′, the area of f(Ω_{r}) is given by

$$A(r)=\iint_{\Omega_r} |f'(z)|^2\, dx \, dy = {1\over 2i}\int_{\partial\Omega_r} \overline{f(z)}f'(z) \,dz={1\over 2i}\int_{|w|=r} \overline{f(g(w)))} f'(g(w)) g'(w)\, dw.$$

Hence

$$A(r)=\pi \sum_n n|c_{-n}|^2 r^{2n}.$$

Since the area is non-negative

$$\sum_{n>0} n|c_n|^2 r^{-2n} \le \sum_{n>0} n |c_{-n}|^2 r^{2n}.$$

The result follows by letting r decrease to 1.

== Milin's proof of Grunsky inequalities ==
If

$$p(w)=\sum_{n=1}^N n^{-1} \lambda_n \Phi_n(w),$$

then

$$p(g(z))=\left( \sum_{n=1}^N n^{-1}\lambda_n z^n\right) +\left(\sum_{m=1}^\infty \sum_{n=1}^N \lambda_n c_{nm}z^{-m}\right).$$

Applying Milin's area theorem,

$$\sum_{m=1}^\infty m\left|\sum_{n=1}^N c_{mn}\lambda_n\right|^2 \le \sum_{n=1}^N {1\over n}|\lambda_n|^2.$$

(Equality holds here if and only if the complement of the image of g has Lebesgue measure zero.)

So a fortiori

$$\sum_{m=1}^N m\left|\sum_{n=1}^N c_{mn}\lambda_n\right|^2 \le \sum_{n=1}^N {1\over n} |\lambda_n|^2.$$

Hence the symmetric matrix

$$a_{mn}= \sqrt{mn} c_{mn},$$

regarded as an operator on C^{N} with its standard inner product, satisfies

$$\|Ax\|\le \|x\|.$$

So by the Cauchy–Schwarz inequality

$$|(Ax,y)|\le \|x\|\cdot\|y\|.$$

With

$$x_n= \frac{\lambda_n}{\sqrt{n}}=\overline{y_n},$$

this gives the Grunsky inequality:

$$\left |\sum_{m=1}^N\sum_{n=1}^N c_{mn} \lambda_m\lambda_n\right|^2 \le \sum_{n=1}^N {1\over n} |\lambda_n|^2,$$

== Criterion for univalence ==
Let g(z) be a holomorphic function on z > 1 with

$$g(z) = z + b_0 + b_1 z^{-1} + b_2 z^{-2} + \cdots$$

Then g is univalent if and only if the Grunsky coefficients of g satisfy the Grunsky inequalities for all N.

In fact the conditions have already been shown to be necessary. To see sufficiency, note that

$$\log {g(z) -g(\zeta)\over z -\zeta}=-\sum_{m,n\ge 1} c_{mn}z^{-m}\zeta^{-n}$$

makes sense when |z| and |ζ| are large and hence the coefficients c_{mn} are defined. If the Grunsky inequalities are satisfied then it is easy to see that the |c_{mn}| are uniformly bounded and hence the expansion on the left hand side converges for |z| > 1 and |ζ| > 1. Exponentiating both sides, this implies that g is univalent.

== Pairs of univalent functions ==
Let $F(z)$ and $g(\zeta)$ be univalent holomorphic functions on |z| < 1 and |ζ| > 1, such that their images are disjoint in C. Suppose that these functions are normalized so that

$$g(\zeta)=\zeta+a_0 + b_1\zeta^{-1} + b_2\zeta^{-2} + \cdots$$

and

$$F(z)=af(z)$$

with a ≠ 0 and

$$f(z) = z + a_2z^2 + a_3z^3 + \cdots.$$

The Grunsky matrix (c_{mn}) of this pair of functions is defined for all non-zero m and n by the formulas:

$$\begin{align}
\log {g(\zeta)-g(\eta)\over \zeta -\eta} &= -\sum_{m,n\ge 1} c_{mn} \zeta^{-m} \eta^{-n} \\
\log {g(\zeta) - f(z)\over \zeta} -\log {g(\zeta)\over \zeta} &= -\sum_{m,n\ge 1} c_{-m,n} z^m\zeta^{-n} \\
\log {f(z)-f(w)\over z -w} -\log{f(z)\over z} -\log{f(w)\over w} &= -\sum_{m,n\ge 1} c_{-m,-n} z^m w^n
\end{align}$$

with

$$c_{m,-n} =c_{-n,m}, \qquad m,n \ge 1,$$

so that (c_{mn}) is a symmetric matrix.

In 1972 the American mathematician James Hummel extended the Grunsky inequalities to this matrix, proving that for any sequence of complex numbers λ_{±1}, ..., λ_{±N}

$$\left |\sum_{n,m\ne 0} c_{mn}\lambda_m\lambda_n \right | \le \sum_{n\ne 0} \frac{1}{|n|} |\lambda_n|^2.$$

The proof proceeds by computing the area of the image of the complement of the images of |z| < r < 1 under F and |ζ| > R > 1 under g under a suitable Laurent polynomial h(w).

Let $\phi_{n}$ and $\phi_{-n}$ denote the Faber polynomials of g and $f(z^{-1})^{-1}$ and set

$$h(w) =\sum_{n\ge 1} \frac{\lambda_n}{n} \Phi_n(w) + \sum_{n\ge 1} \frac{\lambda_{-n}}{n} \Phi_{-n}\left (\frac{a}{w}\right ).$$

Then:

$$\begin{align}
h(F(z))&=\sum_{n\ge 1} \frac{\lambda_{-n}}{n}z^{-n}+\alpha+\sum_{n\ge 1} \alpha_n z^n, && |z|<1, \alpha_n=\sum_m c_{-n,m}\lambda_m \\
h(g(\zeta))&=\sum_{n\ge 1} \frac{\lambda_n}{n} \zeta^n+\beta +\sum_{n\ge 1} \beta_n \zeta^{-n}, && |\zeta|> 1, \beta_n=\sum_m c_{nm} \lambda_m
\end{align}$$

The area equals

$$\int |h'(z)|^2 \, dx \, dy= \frac{1}{2i}\int_{C_1} \overline{h}(z) h'(z)\, dz -\frac{1}{2i}\int_{C_2} \overline{h}(z) h'(z)\, dz,$$

where C_{1} is the image of the circle |ζ| = R under g and C_{2} is the image of the circle |z| = r under F.

Hence

$$\frac{1}{\pi}\iint |h'|^2 \, dx \, dy = \left[\sum_{n\ge 1} \frac{1}{n}|\lambda_{-n}|^2 - \sum_{n\ge 1} |\alpha_n|^2 r^{2n} \right ] +\left[\sum_{n\ge 1}{1\over n}|\lambda_n|^2 - \sum_{n\ge 1} |\beta_n|^2 R^{-2n}\right].$$

Since the area is positive, the right hand side must also be positive. Letting r increase to 1 and R decrease to 1, it follows that

$$\sum_{m\ne 0} |m| \left|\sum_{n\ne 0} c_{mn}\lambda_n\right|^2 \le \sum_{m\ne 0} {1\over |m|} |\lambda_m|^2$$

with equality if and only if the complement of the images has Lebesgue measure zero.

As in the case of a single function g, this implies the required inequality.

== Unitarity ==
The matrix

$$a_{mn}=\sqrt{|mn|} \cdot c_{mn}$$

of a single function g or a pair of functions F, g is unitary if and only if the complement of the image of g or the union of the images of F and g has Lebesgue measure zero. So, roughly speaking, in the case of one function the image is a slit region in the complex plane; and in the case of two functions the two regions are separated by a closed Jordan curve.

In fact the infinite matrix A acting on the Hilbert space of square summable sequences satisfies

$$A^*A=I,$$

But if J denotes complex conjugation of a sequence, then

$$JAJ=A^*, \quad JA^*J=A$$

since A is symmetric. Hence

$$AA^*=JA^*AJ=I$$

so that A is unitary.

== Equivalent forms of Grunsky inequalities ==
=== Goluzin inequalities ===
If g(z) is a normalized univalent function in |z| > 1, z_{1}, ..., z_{N} are distinct points with |z_{n}| > 1 and α_{1}, ..., α_{N} are complex numbers, the Goluzin inequalities, proved in 1947 by the Russian mathematician Gennadi Mikhailovich Goluzin (1906–1953), state that

$$\left|\sum_{m=1}^N \sum_{n=1}^N \alpha_m\alpha_n \log{g(z_m) -g(z_n)\over z_m -z_n}\right|^2 \le \sum_{m=1}^N\sum_{n=1}^N \alpha_m \overline{\alpha_n} \log {1\over 1-(z_m\overline{z_n})^{-1}}.$$

To deduce them from the Grunsky inequalities, let

$$\lambda_k=\sum_{n=1}^N \alpha_n z_n^{-k}.$$

for k > 0.

Conversely the Grunsky inequalities follow from the Goluzin inequalities by taking

$$\alpha_m={1\over N} \sum_{n=1}^N\lambda_n z_n^m.$$

where

$$z_n=re^{2\pi i n\over N}$$

with r > 1, tending to ∞.

=== Bergman–Schiffer inequalities ===
Bergman & Schiffer (1951) gave another derivation of the Grunsky inequalities using reproducing kernels and singular integral operators in geometric function theory; a more recent related approach can be found in Baranov & Hedenmalm (2008).

Let f(z) be a normalized univalent function in |z| < 1, let z_{1}, ..., z_{N} be distinct points with |z_{n}| < 1 and let α_{1}, ..., α_{N} be complex numbers. The Bergman-Schiffer inequalities state that

$$\left|\sum_{m=1}^N \sum_{n=1}^N \alpha_m \alpha_n\left[ \frac{f'(z_m)f'(z_n)}{(f(z_m)-f(z_n))^2} - \frac{1}{(z_m-z_n)^2}\right] \right| \le \sum_{m=1}^N \sum_{n=1}^N \alpha_m \overline{\alpha_n} \frac{1}{(1-z_m\overline{z_n})^2}.$$

To deduce these inequalities from the Grunsky inequalities, set

$$\lambda_k=k\sum_{n=1}^N \alpha_n z_n^k.$$

for k > 0.

Conversely the Grunsky inequalities follow from the Bergman-Schiffer inequalities by taking

$$\alpha_m= \frac{1}{N} \sum_{n=1}^N \frac{1}{n} \lambda_n z_n^m.$$

where

$$z_n=re^{\frac{2\pi i n}{N}}$$

with r < 1, tending to 0.

== Applications ==
The Grunsky inequalities imply many inequalities for univalent functions. They were also used by Schiffer and Charzynski in 1960 to give a completely elementary proof of the Bieberbach conjecture for the fourth coefficient; a far more complicated proof had previously been found by Schiffer and Garabedian in 1955. In 1968 Pedersen and Ozawa independently used the Grunsky inequalities to prove the conjecture for the sixth coefficient.

In the proof of Schiffer and Charzynski, if

$$f(x)=z+a_2 z^2 + a_3 z^3 + a_4z^4 + \cdots$$

is a normalized univalent function in |z| < 1, then

$$g(z) =f(z^2)^{-1/2}=z + b_1 z^{-1} + b_3 z^{-3} + \cdots$$

is an odd univalent function in |z| > 1.

Combining Gronwall's area theorem for f with the Grunsky inequalities for the first 2 x 2 minor of the Grunsky matrix of g leads to a bound for |a_{4}| in terms of a simple function of a_{2} and a free complex parameter. The free parameter can be chosen so that the bound becomes a function of half the modulus of a_{2} and it can then be checked directly that this function is no greater than 4 on the range [0,1].

As Milin showed, the Grunsky inequalities can be exponentiated. The simplest case proceeds by writing

$$\log {g(z)-g(\zeta)\over z-\zeta} = - \sum_{n\ge 1} a_n(\zeta^{-1})z^{-n}.$$

with a_{n}(w) holomorphic in |w| < 1.

The Grunsky inequalities, with λ_{n} = w^{n} imply that

$$\sum_{n\ge 1} n|a_n(w)|^2 \le - \log (1-|w|^2).$$

On the other hand, if

$$\sum_{m\ge 0} b_m t^m = \exp \sum_{n\ge 1} a_n t^n$$

as formal power series, then the first of the Lebedev–Milin inequalities (1965) states that

$$\sum_{n\ge 0} |b_n|^2 \le \exp \sum_{n\ge 1} n |a_n|^2.$$

Equivalently the inequality states that if g(z) is a polynomial with g(0) = 0, then

$${1\over 2\pi} \int_0^{2\pi} |e^g|^2 \, d\theta \le e^A,$$

where A is the area of g(D),

To prove the inequality, note that the coefficients are determined by the recursive formula

$$b_n={1\over n}\sum_{m=1}^n ma_m b_{n-m}$$

so that by the Cauchy–Schwarz inequality

$$|b_n|^2 \le {1\over n} \sum m^2 |a_m|^2 |b_{n-m}|^2.$$

The quantities c_{n} obtained by imposing equality here:

$$c_n= {1\over n} \sum m^2 |a_m|^2 c_{n-m}$$

satisfy $|b_n|^2 \le c_n$ and hence, reversing the steps,

$$\sum |b_n|^2 \le \sum c_n = \exp \sum_{m\ge 1} m|a_m|^2.$$

In particular defining b_{n}(w) by the identity

$$\sum b_n(\zeta^{-1}) z^{-n} = \exp \sum a_m(\zeta^{-1}) z^{-m} = {g(z)-g(\zeta)\over z-\zeta},$$

the following inequality must hold for |w| < 1

$$\sum_{n\ge 0} |b_n(w)|^2 \le (1-|w|^2)^{-1}.$$

== Beurling transform ==
The Beurling transform (also called the Beurling-Ahlfors transform and the Hilbert transform in the complex plane) provides one of the most direct methods of proving the Grunsky inequalities, following Bergman & Schiffer (1951) and Baranov & Hedenmalm (2008).

The Beurling transform is defined on L^{2}(C) as the operation of multiplication by $z/\overline{z}$ on Fourier transforms. It thus defines a unitary operator. It can also be defined directly as a principal value integral

$$(Th)(w)=\lim_{\varepsilon\to 0} -{1\over \pi}\iint_{|z-w|\ge \varepsilon} {h(z)\over (z-w)^2} \,dx \, dy.$$

For any bounded open region Ω in C it defines a bounded operator T_{Ω} from the conjugate of the Bergman space of Ω onto the Bergman space of Ω: a square integrable holomorphic function is extended to 0 off Ω to produce a function in L^{2}(C) to which T is applied and the result restricted to Ω, where it is holomorphic. If f is a holomorphic univalent map from the unit disk D onto Ω then the Bergman space of Ω and its conjugate can be identified with that of D and T_{Ω} becomes the singular integral operator with kernel

$$K_f(z,w)= \frac{f'(z)f'(w)}{(f(z)-f(w))^2}.$$

It defines a contraction. On the other hand, it can be checked that T_{D} = 0 by computing directly on powers $\overline{z}^n$ using Stokes theorem to transfer the integral to the boundary.

It follows that the operator with kernel

$${f'(z)f'(w)\over (f(z)-f(w))^2} - {1\over (z-w)^2}={\partial^2\over\partial z \partial w} \log {f(z) -f(w)\over z-w} =-\sum_{m,n\ge 1} mnc_{mn} z^{m-1}w^{n-1}$$

acts as a contraction on the conjugate of the Bergman space of D. Hence, if

$$p(z)=\lambda_1 + \lambda_2 \overline{z} + \lambda_3 \overline{z}^2 + \cdots + \lambda_N \overline{z}^{N-1},$$

then

$$\sum_{m=1}^N \left|\sum_{n=1}^N c_{mn}\lambda_n\right|^2=\|(T_f-T_z)p\|^2 =\|T_fp\|^2\le \|p\|^2= \sum_{n=1}^N {1\over n} |\lambda_n|^2.$$

== Grunsky operator and Fredholm determinant ==
If Ω is a bounded domain in C with smooth boundary, the operator T_{Ω} can be regarded as a bounded antilinear contractive operator on the Bergman space H = A^{2}(Ω). It is given by the formula

$$(T_\Omega u)(z) = \lim_{\varepsilon\to 0} {1\over \pi} \iint_{|z-w|\ge \varepsilon} {\overline{u(z)}\over (z-w)^2} \,\, dx \, dy$$

for u in the Hilbert space H= A^{2}(Ω). T_{Ω} is called the Grunsky operator of Ω (or f). Its realization on D using a univalent function f mapping D onto Ω and the fact that T_{D} = 0 shows that it is given by restriction of the kernel

$$\frac{f'(z)f'(w)}{(f(z)-f(w))^2} - \frac{1}{(z-w)^2},$$

and is therefore a Hilbert–Schmidt operator.

The antilinear operator T = T_{Ω} satisfies the self-adjointness relation

$$(Tu,v)=(Tv,u)$$

for u, v in H.

Thus A = T^{2} is a compact self-adjont linear operator on H with

$$(Au,u)=(Tu,Tu)=\|Tu\|^2\ge 0,$$

so that A is a positive operator. By the spectral theorem for compact self-adjoint operators, there is an orthonormal basis u_{n} of H consisting of eigenvectors of A:

$$Au_n=\mu_n u_n,$$

where μ_{n} is non-negative by the positivity of A. Hence

$$\mu_n=\lambda_n^2$$

with λ_{n} ≥ 0. Since T commutes with A, it leaves its eigenspaces invariant. The positivity relation shows that it acts trivially on the zero eigenspace. The other non-zero eigenspaces are all finite-dimensional and mutually orthogonal. Thus an orthonormal basis can be chosen on each eigenspace so that:

$$Tu_n=\lambda_n u_n.$$

(Note that $T(iu_n)=-\lambda_n iu_n$ by antilinearity of T.)

The non-zero λ_{n} (or sometimes their reciprocals) are called the Fredholm eigenvalues of Ω:

$$0\le \lambda_n \le \|T\| \le 1.$$

If Ω is a bounded domain that is not a disk, Ahlfors showed that

$$\|T_\Omega\|< 1.$$

The Fredholm determinant for the domain Ω is defined by

$$\Delta_\Omega=\det (I- T_\Omega^2) =\prod (1-\lambda_n^2).$$

Note that this makes sense because A = T^{2} is a trace class operator.

Schiffer & Hawley (1962) showed that if $0\in\Omega$ and f fixes 0, then

$$\Delta_\Omega= -\frac{1}{12\pi} \left[ \|\partial_z \log f' \|^2_D +\|\partial_z \log g'\|^2_{D^c} - 2 \left \|\partial_z\log \frac{f(z)}{z} \right \|^2_D - 2 \left \|\partial_z\log \frac{g(z)}{z} \right \|^2_{D^c}\right].$$

Here the norms are in the Bergman spaces of D and its complement D^{c} and g is a univalent map from D^{c} onto Ω^{c} fixing ∞.

A similar formula applies in the case of a pair of univalent functions (see below).

== Singular integral operators on a closed curve ==
Let Ω be a bounded simply connected domain in C with smooth boundary C = ∂Ω. Thus there is a univalent holomorphic map f from the unit disk D onto Ω extending to a smooth map between the boundaries S^{1} and C.
