= Adolph Winkler Goodman =

American mathematician

- Born: July 20, 1915
- Died: July 30, 2004 (aged 89)
- Known for: Analytic geometry, graph theory, number theory
- Scientific career
- Fields: Mathematics
- Thesis: On some determinants related to ρ-Valent functions (1947)
- Doctoral advisor: Otto Szász, Edgar Raymond Lorch

Adolph Winkler Goodman (July 20, 1915 – July 30, 2004) was an American mathematician who contributed to number theory, graph theory and to the theory of univalent functions: The conjecture on the coefficients of multivalent functions named after him is considered the most interesting challenge in the area after the Bieberbach conjecture, proved by Louis de Branges in 1985.

== Life and work ==
In 1948, he made a mathematical conjecture on coefficients of ρ-valent functions, first published in his Columbia University dissertation thesis and then in a closely following paper. After the proof of the Bieberbach conjecture by Louis de Branges, this conjecture is considered the most interesting challenge in the field, and he himself and coauthors answered affirmatively to the conjecture for some classes of ρ-valent functions. His researches in the field continued in the paper Univalent functions and nonanalytic curves, published in 1957: in 1968, he published the survey Open problems on univalent and multivalent functions, which eventually led him to write the two-volume book Univalent Functions.

Apart from his research activity, He was actively involved in teaching: he wrote several college and high school textbooks including Analytic Geometry and the Calculus, and the five-volume set Algebra from A to Z.

He retired in 1993, became a Distinguished Professor Emeritus in 1995, and died in 2004.

== Selected works ==
- Goodman, A.W. (1968). Modern calculus with analytic geometry. Vol. 2. Macmillan. LCCN 67015537.
- Goodman, A.W.; Ratti, J.S. (1979). Finite mathematics with applications. Macmillan. ISBN 9780023447600. LCCN 78005799.
- Goodman, A.W. (1983). Univalent functions. Vol. 1. Mariner Pub. Co. ISBN 9780936166100. LCCN 83007930.
- Goodman, A.W. (1983). Univalent functions. Vol. 2. Mariner Pub. Co. ISBN 9780936166117. LCCN 83007930.
- Goodman, A.W. (1963). Analytic geometry and the calculus. Collier-MacMillan student editions. Macmillan. ISBN 9780023449604. LCCN 63008395.
- Goodman, A.W. (1968). The Pleasures of Math, by A. W. Goodman.
- Goodman, A.W.; Patton, B.M. (1980). The mainstream of algebra and trigonometry. Houghton Mifflin. ISBN 9780395267653. LCCN 79090059.
- Goodman, A.W.; Ratti, J.S. (1979). Mathematics for Management and Social Sciences. Holt, Rinehart and Winston. ISBN 9780030221613. LCCN 78011841.
- Goodman, A.W.; Saff, E.B. (1981). Calculus, Concepts and Calculations. Macmillan. ISBN 9780023447402. LCCN 79026449.
- Goodman A.W. (1977). Concise Review of Algebra and Trigonometry. Saunders. ISBN 9780721641614.
- Goodman A.W. (1980). Instructor's Manual Analytic Geometry and the Calculus. Macmillan. ISBN 9780023449901.
- Goodman A.W. (1948). On Some Determinants Related to P-valent Functions. Columbia university. LCCN a48009674.
- Goodman A.W. (1941). Sturm-Liouville Differential Equations. University of Cincinnati.
- Goodman A.W. (1939). An Analytical Consideration of Fractional Crystallization Problems in N-component Systems. University of Cincinnati.

== Biographical references ==
- Grinshpan, Arcadii Z. (1997), "A. W. Goodman: research mathematician and educator", Complex Variables, Theory and Application, 33 (1–4): 1–28, doi:10.1080/17476939708815008
- The Editorial Staff (2004). "In Memoriam: Al Goodman". The Quaternion - the Newsletter of the Department of Mathematics. 19 (1). University of South Florida.

== Additional sources ==
- Faith, C.C. (2004). "Chapter 18: Snapshots of Some Mathematical Friends and Places". Rings And Things And A Fine Array Of Twentieth Century Associative Algebra. Mathematical Surveys and Monographs. American Mathematical Society. p. 287. ISBN 9780821836729. LCCN 04052844.
