= Carathéodory kernel theorem =

In mathematics, the Carathéodory kernel theorem is a result in complex analysis and geometric function theory established by the Greek mathematician Constantin Carathéodory in 1912. The uniform convergence on compact sets of a sequence of holomorphic univalent functions, defined on the unit disk in the complex plane and fixing 0, can be formulated purely geometrically in terms of the limiting behaviour of the images of the functions. The kernel theorem has wide application in the theory of univalent functions and in particular provides the geometric basis for the Loewner differential equation.

== Kernel of a sequence of open sets ==
Let U_{n} be a sequence of open sets in C containing 0. Let V_{n} be the connected component of the interior of U_{n} ∩ U_{n + 1} ∩ ... containing 0. The kernel of the sequence is defined to be the union of the V_{n}'s, provided it is non-empty; otherwise it is defined to be $\{0\}$. Thus the kernel is either a connected open set containing 0 or the one point set $\{0\}$. The sequence is said to converge to a kernel if each subsequence has the same kernel.

Examples

- If U_{n} is an increasing sequence of connected open sets containing 0, then the kernel is just the union.
- If U_{n} is a decreasing sequence of connected open sets containing 0, then, if 0 is an interior point of U_{1} ∩ U_{2} ∩ ..., the sequence converges to the component of the interior containing 0. Otherwise, if 0 is not an interior point, the sequence converges to $\{0\}$.

== Kernel theorem ==
Let f_{n}(z) be a sequence of holomorphic univalent functions on the unit disk D, normalised so that f_{n}(0) = 0 and f '_{n} (0) > 0. Then f_{n} converges uniformly on compacts in D to a function f if and only if U_{n} = f_{n}(D) converges to its kernel and this kernel is not C. If the kernel is $\{0\}$, then f = 0. Otherwise the kernel is a connected open set U, f is univalent on D and f(D) = U.

== Proof ==
Using Hurwitz's theorem and Montel's theorem, it is straightforward to check that if f_{n} tends uniformly on compacts to f, then each subsequence of U_{n} has kernel U = f(D).

Conversely if U_{n} converges to a kernel not equal to C, then by the Koebe quarter theorem U_{n} contains the disk of radius f '_{n}(0) / 4 with centre 0. The assumption that U ≠ C implies that these radii are uniformly bounded. By the Koebe distortion theorem

$$|f_n(z)| \le f_n^\prime(0) {|z|\over (1-|z|)^2}.$$

Hence the sequence f_{n} is uniformly bounded on compact sets. If two subsequences converge to holomorphic limits f and g, then f(0) = g(0) and with f'(0), g'(0) ≥ 0. By the first part and the assumptions it follows that f(D) = g(D). Uniqueness in the Riemann mapping theorem forces f = g, so the original sequence f_{n} is uniformly convergent on compact sets.
