= Loewner differential equation =

Ordinary differential equation

In mathematics, the Loewner differential equation, or Loewner equation, is an ordinary differential equation discovered by Charles Loewner in 1923 in complex analysis and geometric function theory. Originally introduced for studying slit mappings (conformal mappings of the open disk onto the complex plane with a curve joining 0 to ∞ removed), Loewner's method was later developed in 1943 by the Russian mathematician Pavel Parfenevich Kufarev (1909–1968). Any family of domains in the complex plane that expands continuously in the sense of Carathéodory to the whole plane leads to a one parameter family of conformal mappings, called a Loewner chain, as well as a two parameter family of holomorphic univalent self-mappings of the unit disk, called a Loewner semigroup. This semigroup corresponds to a time dependent holomorphic vector field on the disk given by a one parameter family of holomorphic functions on the disk with positive real part. The Loewner semigroup generalizes the notion of a univalent semigroup.

The Loewner differential equation has led to inequalities for univalent functions that played an important role in the solution of the Bieberbach conjecture by Louis de Branges in 1985. Loewner himself used his techniques in 1923 for proving the conjecture for the third coefficient. The Schramm–Loewner equation, a stochastic generalization of the Loewner differential equation discovered by Oded Schramm in the late 1990s, has been extensively developed in probability theory and conformal field theory.

== Subordinate univalent functions ==
Let $f$ and $g$ be holomorphic univalent functions on the unit disk $D$, $|z|<1$, with $f(0)=0=g(0)$.

$f$ is said to be subordinate to $g$ if and only if there is a univalent mapping $\varphi$ of $D$ into itself fixing $0$ such that

$$\displaystyle{f(z)=g(\varphi(z))}$$

for $|z|<1$.

A necessary and sufficient condition for the existence of such a mapping $\varphi$ is that

$$f(D)\subseteq g(D).$$

Necessity is immediate.

Conversely $\varphi$ must be defined by

$$\displaystyle{\varphi(z)=g^{-1}(f(z)).}$$

By definition φ is a univalent holomorphic self-mapping of $D$ with $\varphi(0)=0$.

Since such a map satisfies $0<|\varphi'(0)|\leq 1$ and takes each disk $D_r$, $|z|<r$ with $0<r<1$, into itself, it follows that

$$\displaystyle{ |f^\prime(0)| \le  |g^\prime(0)|}$$

and

$$\displaystyle{f(D_r) \subseteq g(D_r).}$$

== Loewner chain ==
For $0\leq t\leq \infty$ let $U(t)$ be a family of open connected and simply connected subsets of $\mathbb{C}$ containing $0$, such that

$$U(s) \subsetneq U(t)$$

if $s<t$,

$$U(t)=\bigcup_{s<t} U(s)$$

and

$$U(\infty)=\mathbb{C}.$$

Thus if $s_n\uparrow t$,

$$U(s_n) \rightarrow U(t)$$

in the sense of the Carathéodory kernel theorem.

If $D$ denotes the unit disk in $\mathbb{C}$, this theorem implies that the unique univalent maps $f_t(z)$

$$f_t(D)=U(t), \,\,\, f_t(0)=0, \,\,\, \partial_z f_t(0)=1$$

given by the Riemann mapping theorem are uniformly continuous on compact subsets of $[0, \infty) \times D$.

Moreover, the function $a(t)=f^\prime_t(0)$ is positive, strictly increasing and continuous.

By a reparametrization it can be assumed that

$$f^\prime_t(0)=e^t.$$

Hence

$$f_t(z)=e^tz + a_2(t) z^2 + \cdots$$

The univalent mappings $f_t(z)$ are called a Loewner chain.

The Koebe distortion theorem shows that knowledge of the chain is equivalent to the properties of the open sets $U(t)$.

== Loewner semigroup ==
If $f_t(z)$ is a Loewner chain, then

$$\displaystyle{f_s(D) \subsetneq f_t(D)}$$

for $s<t$ so that there is a unique univalent self mapping of the disk $\varphi_{s,t}(z)$ fixing $0$ such that

$$\displaystyle{ f_s(z)=f_t(\varphi_{s,t}(z)).}$$

By uniqueness the mappings $\varphi_{s,t}$ have the following semigroup property:

$$\displaystyle{\varphi_{t,r}\circ \varphi_{s,t}=\varphi_{s,r}}$$

for $s\leq t\leq r$.

They constitute a Loewner semigroup.

The self-mappings depend continuously on $s$ and $t$ and satisfy

$$\displaystyle{\varphi_{t,t}(z)=z.}$$

== Loewner differential equation ==
The Loewner differential equation can be derived either for the Loewner semigroup or equivalently for the Loewner chain.

For the semigroup, let

$$\displaystyle{ w_s(z)=\partial_t\varphi_{s,t}(z)|_{t=s}}$$

then

$$\displaystyle{ w_s(z)=-zp_s(z)}$$

with

$$\displaystyle{\Re\, p_s(z) > 0}$$

for $|z|<1$.

Then $w(t)=\varphi_{s,t}(z)$ satisfies the ordinary differential equation

$$\displaystyle{{dw\over dt} = -w p_t(w)}$$

with initial condition $w(s)=z$.

To obtain the differential equation satisfied by the Loewner chain $f_t(z)$ note that

$$\displaystyle{f_t(z)=f_s(\varphi_{s,t}(z))}$$

so that $f_t(z)$ satisfies the differential equation

$$\displaystyle{\partial_t f_t(z)= zp_t(z) \partial_zf_t(z)}$$

with initial condition

$$\displaystyle{f_t(z)|_{t=0} =f_0(z).}$$

The Picard–Lindelöf theorem for ordinary differential equations guarantees that these equations can be solved and that the solutions are holomorphic in $z$.

The Loewner chain can be recovered from the Loewner semigroup by passing to the limit:

$$\displaystyle{ f_s(z) = \lim_{t\rightarrow \infty} e^t \phi_{s,t}(z).}$$

Finally given any univalent self-mapping $\psi(z)$ of $D$, fixing $0$, it is possible to construct a Loewner semigroup $\varphi_{s,t}(z)$ such that

$$\displaystyle{\varphi_{0,1}(z)=\psi(z).}$$

Similarly given a univalent function $g$ on $D$ with $g(0)=0$, such that $g(D)$ contains the closed unit disk, there is a Loewner chain $f_t(z)$ such that

$$\displaystyle{f_0(z)=z,\,\,\, f_1(z)=g(z).}$$

Results of this type are immediate if $\psi$ or $g$ extend continuously to $\partial D$. They follow in general by replacing mappings $f(z)$ by approximations $f(rz)/r$ and then using a standard compactness argument.

== Slit mappings ==
Holomorphic functions $p(z)$ on $D$ with positive real part and normalized so that $p(0)=1$ are described by the Herglotz representation theorem:

$$\displaystyle{ p(z) =\int_0^{2\pi} {1 + e^{-i\theta}z\over 1 -e^{-i\theta}z} \,  d\mu(\theta),}$$

where $\mu$ is a probability measure on the circle. Taking a point measure singles out functions

$$\displaystyle{p_t(z)= {1+\kappa(t) z\over 1-\kappa(t) z}}$$

with $|\kappa(t)|=1$, which were the first to be considered by Loewner (1923).

Inequalities for univalent functions on the unit disk can be proved by using the density for uniform convergence on compact subsets of slit mappings. These are conformal maps of the unit disk onto the complex plane with a Jordan arc connecting a finite point to ∞ omitted. Density follows by applying the Carathéodory kernel theorem. In fact any univalent function $f(z)$ is approximated by functions

$$\displaystyle{g(z)=f(rz)/r}$$

which take the unit circle onto an analytic curve. A point on that curve can be connected to infinity by a Jordan arc. The regions obtained by omitting a small segment of the analytic curve to one side of the chosen point converge to $g(D)$ so the corresponding univalent maps of $D$ onto these regions converge to $g$ uniformly on compact sets.

To apply the Loewner differential equation to a slit function $f$, the omitted Jordan arc $c(t)$ from a finite point to $\infty$ can be parametrized by $[0,\infty)$ so that the map univalent map $f_t$ of $D$ onto $\mathbb{C}$ less $c([t,\infty))$ has the form

$$\displaystyle{ f_t(z)=e^t(z+b_2(t)z^2 + b_3(t) z^3 + \cdots)}$$

with $b_n$ continuous. In particular

$$\displaystyle{f_0(z) = f(z).}$$

For $s\leq t$, let

$$\displaystyle{\varphi_{s,t}(z)= f_t^{-1} \circ f_s(z)= e^{s-t} (z+a_2(s,t)z^2 + a_3(s,t) z^3 + \cdots)}$$

with $a_n$ continuous.

This gives a Loewner chain and Loewner semigroup with

$$\displaystyle{p_t(z)={1+\kappa(t) z\over 1-\kappa(t) z}}$$

where $\kappa$ is a continuous map from $[0,\infty)$ to the unit circle.

To determine $\kappa$, note that $\varphi_{s,t}$ maps the unit disk into the unit disk with a Jordan arc from an interior point to the boundary removed. The point where it touches the boundary is independent of $s$ and defines a continuous function $\lambda(t)$ from $[0,\infty)$ to the unit circle. $\kappa(t)$ is the complex conjugate (or inverse) of $\lambda(t)$:

$$\displaystyle{\kappa(t)=\lambda(t)^{-1}.}$$

Equivalently, by Carathéodory's theorem $f_t$ admits a continuous extension to the closed unit disk and $\lambda(t)$, sometimes called the driving function, is specified by

$$\displaystyle{f_t(\lambda(t))=c(t).}$$

Not every continuous function $\kappa$ comes from a slit mapping, but Kufarev showed this was true when $\kappa$ has a continuous derivative.

== Application to Bieberbach conjecture ==
Loewner (1923) used his differential equation for slit mappings to prove the Bieberbach conjecture

$$\displaystyle{|a_3|\le 3}$$

for the third coefficient of a univalent function

$$\displaystyle{f(z)=z + a_2 z^2 + a_3z^3 +\cdots}$$

In this case, rotating if necessary, it can be assumed that $a_3$ is non-negative.

Then

$$\displaystyle{\varphi_{0,t}(z)=e^{-t}(z+a_2(t)z^2 + a_3(t) z^3 +\cdots)}$$

with $a_n$ continuous. They satisfy

$$\displaystyle{a_n(0)=0,\,\, a_n(\infty)=a_n.}$$

If

$$\displaystyle{\alpha(t)=e^{-t}\kappa(t),}$$

the Loewner differential equation implies

$$\displaystyle{\dot{a}_2=-2\alpha}$$

and

$$\displaystyle{\dot{a}_3 =-2\alpha^2 -4\alpha\, a_2.}$$

So

$$\displaystyle{ a_2 =-2\int_{0}^\infty \alpha(t) \, dt}$$

which immediately implies Bieberbach's inequality

$$\displaystyle{|a_2|\le 2.}$$

Similarly

$$\displaystyle{a_3=-2\int_0^\infty \alpha(t)^2\, dt +4\left(\int_0^\infty \alpha(t)\, dt\right)^2}$$

Since $a_3$ is non-negative and $|\kappa(t)|=1$,

$$\displaystyle{|a_3|=2\int_0^\infty |\Re \alpha(t)^2|\, dt +4\left(\int_0^\infty \Re \alpha(t)\, dt\right)^2}
\le 2\int_0^\infty |\Re \alpha(t)^2|\, dt +4\left(\int_0^\infty e^{-t}\,dt\right)\left(\int_0^\infty e^t(\Re \alpha(t))^2\, dt\right)
=1 +4\int_0^\infty (e^{-t}-e^{-2t}) (\Re \kappa(t))^2\, dt \le 3,$$

using the Cauchy–Schwarz inequality.

== See also ==
- Loewner energy
