= Korevaar =

Korevaar is a Dutch surname that may refer to

- Jacob Korevaar (1923–2025), Dutch mathematician
- Jan Jaap Korevaar (born 1957), Dutch water polo player
- Jeanne Korevaar (born 1996), Dutch racing cyclist
- Merijn Korevaar (born 1994), Dutch cyclist, brother of Jeanne
- Nijs Korevaar (1927–2016), Dutch water polo player, father of Jan Jaap and brother of Jacob
