= Grunsky's inequalities =

Grunsky's inequalities may refer to

- Inequalities related to a Grunsky matrix
- An inequality used in the proof of Grunsky's theorem
