= Nikolai Lebedev =

Nikolai Lebedev may refer to:

- Nikolai Lebedev (actor) (1921–2022), Soviet and Russian actor
- Nikolai Lebedev (film director) (born 1966), Russian film director
- Nikolai Andreevich Lebedev (1919–1982), Soviet mathematician
- Nikolai Georgiyevich Lebedev (1901–1992), head of the Soviet Civil Administration in Korea (present-day North Korea) from 1947 to 1948
- Nikolai Aleksandrovich Lebedev (1914–1942), Hero of the Soviet Union for whom the asteroid 2342 Lebedev is named
- Nikolai Ivanovich Lebedev (1897–1989), Russian and Soviet film director
