= Goodman's conjecture =

Goodman's conjecture on the coefficients of multivalent functions was proposed in complex analysis in 1948 by Adolph Winkler Goodman, an American mathematician.

== Formulation ==
Let $f(z)= \sum_{n=1}^{\infty}{b_n z^n}$ be a $p$-valent function. The conjecture claims the following coefficients hold:
$$|b_n| \le \sum_{k=1}^{p} \frac{2k(n+p)!}{(p-k)!(p+k)!(n-p-1)!(n^2-k^2)}|b_k|$$

== Partial results ==
It's known that when $p=2,3$, the conjecture is true for functions of the form $P \circ \phi$ where $P$ is a polynomial and $\phi$ is univalent.

== External sources ==
- Goodman, A. W. (1948). "On some determinants related to 𝑝-valent functions". Transactions of the American Mathematical Society. 63: 175–192. doi:10.1090/S0002-9947-1948-0023910-X.
- Lyzzaik, Abdallah; Styer, David (1978). "Goodman's conjecture and the coefficients of univalent functions". Proceedings of the American Mathematical Society. 69: 111–114. doi:10.1090/S0002-9939-1978-0460619-7.
- Grinshpan, Arcadii Z. (2002). "Logarithmic Geometry, Exponentiation, and Coefficient Bounds in the Theory of Univalent Functions and Nonoverlapping Domains". Geometric Function Theory. Handbook of Complex Analysis. Vol. 1. pp. 273–332. doi:10.1016/S1874-5709(02)80012-9. ISBN 978-0-444-82845-3.
- AGrinshpan, A.Z. (1997). "On the Goodman conjecture and related functions of several complex variables". Department of Mathematics, University of South Florida, Tampa, FL. 9 (3): 198–204. MR 1466800.
- Grinshpan, A. Z. (1995). "On an identity related to multivalent functions". Proceedings of the American Mathematical Society. 123 (4): 1199. doi:10.1090/S0002-9939-1995-1242085-7.
