= Walter Gautschi =

Swiss-American mathematician

- Born: Walter Gautschi; December 11, 1927 (age 98); Basel, Switzerland
- Education: University of Basel
- Occupations: Mathematician, professor and writer
- Employer: Purdue University
- Known for: Gautschi's inequality
- Spouse: Erika Gautschi (m. 1960; died 2023)
- Children: 3

Walter Gautschi (/ˈɡaʊtʃi/; GOW-chee; born December 11, 1927) is a Swiss-born American mathematician, writer and professor emeritus of Computer science and Mathematics at Purdue University in West Lafayette, Indiana. He is primarily known for his contributions to numerical analysis and has authored over 200 papers in his area and published four books.

== Early life and education ==
Gautschi was born December 11, 1927, in Basel, Switzerland, to Heinrich Gautschi (1901-1975). His paternal family originally hailed from Reinach. He had one twin brother Werner (1927-1959). He completed a Ph.D. in mathematics from the University of Basel on the thesis Analyse graphischer Integrationsmethoden advised by Alexander Ostrowski and Andreas Speiser (1953).

== Career ==
Since then, he did postdoctoral work as a Janggen-Pöhn Research Fellow at the Istituto Nazionale per le Applicazioni del Calcolo in Rome (1954) and at the Harvard Computation Laboratory (1955). He had positions at the National Bureau of Standards (1956–59), the American University in Washington, D.C., the Oak Ridge National Laboratory (1959–63) before joining Purdue University where he has worked from 1963 to 2000 and now being professor emeritus. He has been a Fulbright Scholar at the Technical University of Munich (1970) and held visiting appointments at the University of Wisconsin–Madison (1976), Argonne National Laboratory, the Wright-Patterson Air Force Base, ETH Zurich (1996-2001), the University of Padova (1997), and the University of Basel (2000).

As well-known (e.g. Gerhard Wanner, Geneva c. 2011 and the well-known first-hand sources and subsequent reports such as Math. Intelligencer, etc), one of Gautschi's most important contributions on numerical simulation of special functions offered evidence and confidence to de Branges's tour-de-force attack on the elusive Bieberbach conjecture on the magnitude of coefficients of schlicht functions, which hitherto received only slow, difficult and partial progress by work of Bieberbach, Loewner, Gabaredian and Schiffer.

== Personal life ==
In 1960, Gautschi married Erika, who was previously married to his twin brother Werner (1927-1959). Werner was also an academic professor and lecturer and emigrated to the United States with his wife in 1956. After his sudden death, Erika returned to Switzerland, while being pregnant with her child to Basel where she met Walter and married him in 1960. They had three daughters;

- Theresa (1961-2018), married Ainsworth, two children; Emily Ainsworth (b. 1994) and Keith (b. 1997), formerly of Camas, Washington.
- Doris (b. 1965)
- Caroline Cari (b. 1969)

Through his predeceased twin brother, he has stepson/nephew, Thomas (b. 1960). Gautschi still resides in West Lafayette, Indiana.

== Books ==
- Colloquium approximatietheorie, MC Syllabus 14, Mathematisch Centrum Amsterdam, 1971. With H. Bavinck and G. M. Willems
- Numerical analysis: an introduction, Birkhäuser, Boston, 1997; 2nd edition, 2012.
- Orthogonal polynomials: computation and approximation, Oxford University Press, Oxford, 2004.
- Walter Gautschi, Selected Works with Commentaries, Springer Science & Business Media, 2013, 3 vols., Brezinski, Claude, and Ahmed Sameh, eds.
  - volume 1; volume 2; volume 3
- Orthogonal polynomials in MATLAB: exercises and solutions, SIAM, Philadelphia, 2016.

== Surveys ==
- Gander, W., & Gautschi, W. (2000). Adaptive quadrature—revisited. BIT Numerical Mathematics, 40(1), 84–101.
- Gautschi, W. (1996). Orthogonal polynomials: applications and computation. Acta Numerica, 5, 45–119.
- Gautschi, W. (1981). A survey of Gauss-Christoffel quadrature formulae. In EB Christoffel (pp. 72–147). Birkhäuser, Basel.
- Gautschi, W. (1967). Computational aspects of three-term recurrence relations. SIAM Review, 9(1), 24–82.
