= Loewner energy =

Invariant of simple closed curves

In complex analysis, the Loewner energy is an invariant of a domain in the complex plane, or equivalently an invariant of the boundary of the domain, a simple closed curve.

According to the uniformization theorem, every domain has a conformal mapping to one of three uniform Riemann surfaces: an open unit disk, the complex plane, or the Riemann sphere. In a 1923 work on the Bieberbach conjecture, Charles Loewner showed that (a suitable normalization of) this uniform mapping can be described as the solution to the Loewner differential equation, which depends on a certain real-valued function, the driving function, defined on the boundary of the domain. The Loewner energy was originally defined by Yilin Wang and (independently) by Peter Friz and Atul Shekhar as the Dirichlet energy of this driving function. In later work, Wang found an equivalent definition of the Loewner energy as the Dirichlet energy of the logarithmic derivative of the conformal mapping itself.

This energy is bounded when the boundary of the domain is a Weil–Petersson curve, a kind of quasicircle obeying an additional smoothness condition.
