= Isaak Moiseevich Milin =

Isaak Moiseevich Milin, (Исаак Моисеевич Милин); * February 16, 1919, Oster, Ukrainian Soviet Socialist Republic – † November 17, 1992 Saint-Petersburg (former Leningrad), Russian Federation) was a prominent Soviet/Russian mathematician, doctor of science in physics and mathematics, senior researcher, specialist in Geometric Theory of Functions of a Complex Variable and Applied Mathematics, engineer-lieutenant-colonel at the Soviet Air Force.

== Short biography ==
In 1937 I.M. Milin finished secondary school in Leningrad and matriculated at the Faculty for Mathematics and Mechanics in Leningrad State University. In 1941, because of the outbreak of the war with Germany, he was transferred to continue his studies at the Red Army Air Force Academy in Leningrad, which he graduated from in 1944 with distinction with qualifications of a mathematician and mechanical engineer and in a military rank of an Air Force officer. From this moment and his entire life Milin had been successfully working in various educational and research institutions. Under the scientific supervision of G.M. Goluzin (1906–-1952), Milin wrote a Candidate of Science Dissertation (Ph.D. thesis) that he successfully defended in 1950. In 1964 I.M. Milin defended his Doctoral Dissertation (habilitation). Both his dissertations dealt with development and applications of methods of the Geometric Theory of Functions of Complex Variable. In 1976 after his honorable discharge from the Soviet Air Force I.M. Milin became the head of the laboratory of algorithmization and automation of technological processes at a Leningrad Research Institute “MECHANOBR”.

== Scientific results ==
Milin’s research mostly deals with an important part of complex analysis: theory of regular and meromorphic univalent functions including problems for Taylor and Loran coefficients. Milin's area theorem and coefficient estimates, as well as Milin’s functionals, Milin’s Tauberian theorem, Milin’s constant, Lebedev–Milin inequalities are widely known. In 1949 I.M. Milin and Nikolai Andreevich Lebedev proved a notable Rogozinskij's conjecture (1939) on coefficients of Bieberbach-Eilenberg functions. In 1964 exploring the famous Bieberbach conjecture (1916) Milin seriously improved the known coefficient estimate for univalent functions. Milin’s monograph “Univalent functions and orthonormal systems” (1971) includes the author’s results and thoroughly covers all the achievements on systems of regular functions orthonormal with respect to area obtained by then. There Milin also constructed a sequence of logarithmic functionals (Milin’s functionals) on the basic class of univalent functions S, conjecturing them to be non-positive for any function of this class and showed that his conjecture implied Bieberbach’s. In 1984 Louis de Branges proved Milin’s conjecture and, therefore, the Bieberbach conjecture. The second Milin’s conjecture on logarithmic coefficients published in 1983 is still an open problem. I.M. Milin devoted many years of his scientific life for active research, development, and applications of methods of analysis and optimization for solving engineering problems. He made important contributions to practical applications of mathematical methods for solving problems of automatization of processes of ore enrichment. He authored several text-books for engineers.

== Medals and awards ==
I.M. Milin was honored by fourteen Government awards including the medals “For Fighting Merit” and “For the Victory over Germany in the Great Patriotic War of 1941 -1945.”

== Selected works ==
- Milin I.M., Lebedev N.A. On coefficients of some classes of analytic functions., Doklady of Soviet Academy of Sciences, 1949, v.67, 221 - 223.
- Lebedev N.A., Milin I.M. On coefficients of some classes of analytic functions., Mat. Sbornik, 1951, v.28(70), 2, 359 - 400.
- Milin I.M. The method of areas in the theory of univalent functions, Doklady of Soviet Academy of Sciences, 1964, v.154, 2, 264 - 267.
- Lebedev N.A., Milin I.M. On one inequality, Vestnik of Leningrad University, 1965, 20(19), 157 - 158.
- Milin I.M. Estimates of coefficients of univalent functions, Doklady of Soviet Academy of Sciences, 1965, v. 160, 4, 769 - 771.
- Milin I.M. On coefficients of univalent functions, Doklady of Soviet Academy of Sciences, 1967, v. 176, 1015 - 1018.
- Milin I.M. The method of areas for univalent functions in finitely connected domains., Trudy of the Mathematical Steklov Institute, 1968, 94, 90 - 122.
- Milin I.M. On successive coefficients of univalent functions, Doklady of Soviet Academy of Sciences, 1968, v. 180, 6, 1294 - 1297.
- Milin I.M. Hayman’s regularity theorem for coefficients of univalent functions., Doklady of Soviet Academy of Sciences, 1970, v. 192, 4, 738 - 741.
- Milin I.M. Univalent functions and orthonormal systems, Moscow, Nauka, 1971, English transl., Amer. Math. Soc. Providence, RI, 1977.
- Milin I.M. Methods of finding extrema of functions of many variables, Moscow, Voenisdat, 1971.
- Litvinchuk Y.A., Milin I.M. Estimate of external arcs under a univalent map. Mat Zametki, 1975, v.18, 3, 367 - 378.
- Milin I.M. A property of logarithmic coefficients of univalent functions., in: Metric questions of function theory, Naukova Dumka, Kiev, 1980, 86 - 90.
- Milin I.M. A conjecture about logarithmic coefficients of univalent functions., In: Analytic Number Theory and Function Theory, v.5, Zapiski Nauchn. Seminarov LOMI, 125, 1983, 135 - 143, English transl.: J. Soviet Math. 26 (6), 1984, 2391—2397.
- Braun V.I., Dyumin V.G., Milin I.M., Protsuto V.S., Balance of Metals, IBM computations, a handbook. Moscow, Nedra, 1991.
- Alenitsin Y.E., Grinshpan A.Z., Emelyanov, E.G., Milin I.M., Golusin’s seminar on Geometric Theory of Functions of Complex Variable, Functional Analysis, Ulyanovsk, 37, 1999, 3 - 28.
