= Clausen's formula =

Mathematical formula by Thomas Clausen

In mathematics, Clausen's formula, found by Thomas Clausen (1828), expresses the square of a Gaussian hypergeometric series as a generalized hypergeometric series. It states

$$\;_{2}F_1 \left[\begin{matrix}
a & b  \\
a+b+1/2 \end{matrix}
; x \right]^2   = \;_{3}F_2 \left[\begin{matrix}
2a & 2b &a+b \\
a+b+1/2 &2a+2b \end{matrix}
; x \right]$$

In particular, it gives conditions for a hypergeometric series to be positive. This can be used to prove several inequalities, such as the Askey–Gasper inequality used in the proof of de Branges's theorem.
