= Askey–Gasper inequality =

In mathematics, the Askey–Gasper inequality is an inequality for Jacobi polynomials proved by Richard Askey and George Gasper (1976) and used in the proof of the Bieberbach conjecture.

== Statement ==
For $\beta\geq 0$ and $-1\leq x\leq 1$,

$\sum_{k=0}^n \frac{P_k^{(\alpha,\beta)}(x)}{P_k^{(\beta,\alpha)}(1)} \ge 0$ if and only if $\alpha+\beta\geq -2$,

where $P_k^{(\alpha,\beta)}(x)$ is a Jacobi polynomial.

The case when $\beta=0$ can also be written as

$${}_3F_2 \left (-n,n+\alpha+2,\tfrac{1}{2}(\alpha+1);\tfrac{1}{2}(\alpha+3),\alpha+1;t \right)>0, \qquad 0\leq t<1, \quad \alpha>-1.$$

In this form, with α a non-negative integer, the inequality was used by Louis de Branges in his proof of the Bieberbach conjecture.

== Proof ==
Ekhad gave a short proof of this inequality in 1993, by combining the identity

$$\begin{align}
&\frac{(\alpha+2)_n}{n!}\times {}_3F_2 \left (-n,n+\alpha+2,\tfrac{1}{2}(\alpha+1);\tfrac{1}{2}(\alpha+3),\alpha+1;t \right)\\
=&\sum_{j} \frac{\left(\tfrac{1}{2} \right)_j\left (\tfrac{\alpha}{2}+1 \right )_{n-j} \left (\tfrac{\alpha}{2}+\tfrac{3}{2} \right )_{n-2j}(\alpha+1)_{n-2j}}{j!\left (\tfrac{\alpha}{2}+\tfrac{3}{2} \right )_{n-j}\left (\tfrac{\alpha}{2}+\tfrac{1}{2} \right )_{n-2j}(n-2j)!} \times {}_3F_2\left (-n+2j,n-2j+\alpha+1,\tfrac{1}{2}(\alpha+1);\tfrac{1}{2}(\alpha+2),\alpha+1;t \right )
\end{align}$$

with the Clausen inequality.

== Generalizations ==
Gasper and Rahman (2004) give some generalizations of the Askey–Gasper inequality to basic hypergeometric series.

== See also ==
- Turán's inequalities
