= Nikolai Andreevich Lebedev =

Nikolai Andreevich Lebedev (Russian: Никола́й Андре́евич Ле́бедев; August 8, 1919 – January 8, 1982) was a Soviet mathematician who worked on complex function theory and geometric function theory. Jointly with Isaak Milin, he proved the Lebedev–Milin inequalities that were used in the proof of the Bieberbach conjecture.

== See also ==
- Conformal map
- Power series

== Biographical references ==
- Aleksandrov, I. A.; Bazilevich, I. E.; Kuz'min, G. V.; Lozinskii, S. M.; Tamrazov, P. M.; Shirokov, N. A. (1983), "Николай Андреевич Лебедев (некролог)", Uspekhi Matematicheskikh Nauk, 38 (2(230)): 195–199, MR 0695474, Zbl 0515.01018, translated in English as "Nikolai Andreevich Lebedev (obituary)", Russian Mathematical Surveys, 38 (2): 177–182, 1983, Bibcode:1983RuMaS..38..177A, doi:10.1070/RM1983v038n02ABEH003472, MR 0695474, Zbl 0528.01020.
- Goluzina, E. G.; Zhuk, V. V.; Kuzmina, G. V.; Shirokov, N. A. (2001), "Николай Андреевич Лебедев и Ленинградская школа теории функций (50–70 гг.)", Zapiski Nauchnykh Seminarov POMI, 276: 5–19, MR 1850360, Zbl 1077.01525, translated in English as "Nikolai Andreevich Lebedev and the Leningrad School of Function Theory in the 50s–70s", Journal of Mathematical Sciences, 118 (1): 4733–4739, 2003, doi:10.1023/A:1025562313596, MR 1850360, S2CID 117992735, Zbl 1077.01525.
