= De Branges space =

In mathematics, a de Branges space (sometimes written De Branges space) is a concept in functional analysis and is constructed from a de Branges function.

The concept is named after Louis de Branges who proved numerous results regarding these spaces, especially as Hilbert spaces, and used those results to prove the Bieberbach conjecture.

== De Branges functions ==
A Hermite-Biehler function, also known as de Branges function, is an entire function E from $\Complex$ to $\Complex$ that satisfies the inequality $|E(z)| > |E(\bar z)|$, for all z in the upper half of the complex plane $\Complex^+ = \{z \in \Complex \mid \operatorname{Im}(z) > 0\}$.

== Definition 1 ==
Given a Hermite-Biehler function E, the de Branges space B(E) is defined as the set of all entire functions F such that

$B(E) = \bigg \{ F \text{ is entire } \bigg | \frac{F}{E}, \frac{F^{\#}}{E} \in H_2(\Complex^+), \int_{\reals} \bigg | \frac{F(\lambda)}{E(\lambda)} \bigg |^2 \mathrm{d}\lambda < \infty \bigg \}$

where:

- $\Complex^+ = \{z \in \Complex \mid \operatorname{Im}(z) > 0\}$ is the open upper half of the complex plane.
- $F^{\#}(z) = \overline{F(\bar z)}$.
- $H_2(\Complex^+)$ is the usual Hardy space on the open upper half plane.

== Definition 2 ==
A de Branges space can also be defined as all entire functions F satisfying all of the following conditions:

- $\int_{\Reals} |(F/E)(\lambda)|^2 d\lambda < \infty$
- $|(F/E)(z)|,|(F^{\#}/E)(z)| \leq C_F(\operatorname{Im}(z))^{(-1/2)}, \forall z \in \Complex^+$

== Definition 3 ==
There exists also an axiomatic description, useful in operator theory.

== As Hilbert spaces ==
Given a de Branges space B(E). Define the scalar product:
$$[F,G]=\frac{1}{\pi} \int_{\Reals} \overline{F(\lambda)} G(\lambda) \frac{d\lambda}{|E(\lambda)|^2}.$$

A de Branges space with such a scalar product can be proven to be a Hilbert space.
