= Faber polynomials =

In mathematics, the Faber polynomials P_{m} of a Laurent series

$$\displaystyle f(z)=z^{-1}+a_0+a_1z+\cdots$$

are the polynomials such that

$$\displaystyle P_m(f)-z^{-m}$$

vanishes at z = 0. They were introduced by Faber (1903, 1919) and studied by Grunsky (1939) and Schur (1945).
