= Gautschi's inequality =

In real analysis, a branch of mathematics, Gautschi's inequality is an inequality for ratios of gamma functions. It is named after Walter Gautschi.

== Statement ==
Let $x$ be a positive real number, and let $s\in (0,1)$. Then,

$$x^{1 - s} < \frac{\Gamma(x + 1)}{\Gamma(x + s)} < (x + 1)^{1 - s}.$$

== History ==
In 1948, Wendel proved the inequalities

$$\left(\frac{x}{x + s}\right)^{1 - s} \le \frac{\Gamma(x + s)}{x^s\Gamma(x)} \le 1$$

for $x>0$ and $s\in (0,1)$. He used this to determine the asymptotic behavior of a ratio of gamma functions. The upper bound in this inequality is stronger than the one given above.

In 1959, Gautschi independently proved two inequalities for ratios of gamma functions. His lower bounds were identical to Wendel's. One of his upper bounds was the one given in the statement above, while the other one was sometimes stronger and sometimes weaker than Wendel's.

== Consequences ==
An immediate consequence is the following description of the asymptotic behavior of ratios of gamma functions:

$$\lim_{x \to \infty} \frac{\Gamma(x + 1)}{\Gamma(x + s)x^{1-s}} = 1.$$

== Proofs ==
There are several known proofs of Gautschi's inequality. One simple proof is based on the strict logarithmic convexity of Euler's gamma function. By definition, this means that for every $u$ and $v$ with $u \neq v$ and every $t\in (0,1)$, we have

$$\Gamma(tu + (1 - t)v) < \Gamma(u)^t\Gamma(v)^{1-t}.$$

Apply this inequality with $u=x$, $v=x+1$, and $t=1-s$. Also apply it with $u=x+s$, $v=x+s+1$, and $t=s$. The resulting inequalities are:

$$\begin{align}
\Gamma(x + s) &< \Gamma(x)^{1 - s}\Gamma(x + 1)^s = x^{s - 1}\Gamma(x + 1), \\
\Gamma(x + 1) &< \Gamma(x + s)^s\Gamma(x + s + 1)^{1 - s} = (x + s)^{1 - s}\Gamma(x + s).
\end{align}$$

Rearranging the first of these gives the lower bound, while rearranging the second and applying the trivial estimate $x + s < x + 1$ gives the upper bound.

== Related inequalities ==
A survey of inequalities for ratios of gamma functions was written by Qi.

The proof by logarithmic convexity gives the stronger upper bound

$$\frac{\Gamma(x + 1)}{\Gamma(x + s)} < (x + s)^{1 - s}.$$

Gautschi's original paper proved a different, stronger upper bound,

$$\frac{\Gamma(x + 1)}{\Gamma(x + s)} \le \exp((1 - s)\psi(x + 1)),$$

where $\psi$ is the digamma function. Neither of these upper bounds is always stronger than the other.

Kershaw proved two tighter inequalities. Again assuming that $x>0$ and $s\in(0,1)$,

$$\begin{align}
\left(x + \frac{s}{2}\right)^{1 - s} &< \frac{\Gamma(x + 1)}{\Gamma(x + s)} < \left[x - \frac{1}{2} + \left(s + \frac{1}{4}\right)^{1/2}\right]^{1 - s}, \\
\exp\left((1 - s)\psi(x + s^{1/2})\right) &< \frac{\Gamma(x + 1)}{\Gamma(x + s)} < \exp\left((1 - s)\psi\left(x + \frac{1}{2}(s + 1)\right)\right).
\end{align}$$

Gautschi's inequality is specific to a quotient of gamma functions evaluated at two real numbers having a small difference. However, there are extensions to other situations. If $x$ and $y$ are positive real numbers, then the convexity of $\psi$ leads to the inequality:

$$\frac{1}{2}(\psi(x) + \psi(y)) \le \frac{\log \Gamma(y) - \log \Gamma(x)}{y - x} \le \psi\left(\frac{x + y}{2}\right).$$

For $s\in(0,1)$, this leads to the estimates

$$\exp\bigl((1 - s)\psi(x + s)\bigr) \le \frac{\Gamma(x + 1)}{\Gamma(x + s)} \le \exp\left((1 - s)\psi\left(x + \frac{1}{2}(s + 1)\right)\right).$$

A related but weaker inequality can be easily derived from the mean value theorem and the monotonicity of $\psi$.

A more explicit inequality valid for a wider class of arguments is due to Kečkić and Vasić, who proved that if $y>x>1$, then:

$$\frac{y^{y-1}}{x^{x-1}}e^{x-y} < \frac{\Gamma(y)}{\Gamma(x)} < \frac{y^{y-1/2}}{x^{x-1/2}}e^{x-y}.$$

In particular, for $s\in (0,1)$, we have:

$$\frac{(x + 1)^x}{(x + s)^{x + s - 1}}e^{-(1 - s)} < \frac{\Gamma(x + 1)}{\Gamma(x + s)} < \frac{(x + 1)^{x + 1/2}}{(x + s)^{x + s - 1/2}}e^{-(1 - s)}.$$

Guo, Qi, and Srivastava proved a similar-looking inequality, valid for all $y>x>0$:

$$\frac{(x + 1)^{x + 1}}{(y + 1)^{y + 1}}e^{y-x} < \frac{\Gamma(x + 1)}{\Gamma(y + 1)} < \frac{(x + 1/2)^{x + 1/2}}{(y + 1/2)^{y + 1/2}}e^{y-x}.$$

For $s\in (0,1)$, this leads to:

$$\frac{(x + 1)^{x + 1}}{(x + s)^{x + s}}e^{s - 1} < \frac{\Gamma(x + 1)}{\Gamma(x + s)} < \frac{(x + 1/2)^{x + 1/2}}{(x + s - 1/2)^{x + s - 1/2}}e^{s - 1}.$$
