= George Gasper =

American mathematician

George Gasper is a mathematician at Northwestern University working on special functions, especially orthogonal polynomials and basic hypergeometric series, who introduced the Askey–Gasper inequality.

== Publications ==
- Gasper, George; Rahman, Mizan (2004), Basic hypergeometric series, Encyclopedia of Mathematics and its Applications, vol. 96 (2nd ed.), Cambridge University Press, ISBN 978-0-521-83357-8, MR 2128719
