= Thomas Clausen (mathematician) =

Danish mathematician and astronomer (1801–1885)

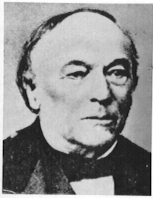
- Born: 16 January 1801; Snogbæk, Sottrup Municipality, Duchy of Schleswig
- Died: 23 May 1885 (aged 84); Tartu, Imperial Russia
- Known for: Clausen function, Clausen's formula

Thomas Clausen (16 January 1801, Snogbæk, Sottrup Municipality, Duchy of Schleswig – 23 May 1885, Tartu, Imperial Russia) was a Danish mathematician and astronomer.

== Life ==
Clausen learned mathematics at home. In 1820, he became a trainee at the Munich Optical Institute and in 1824, at the Altona Observatory after he showed Heinrich Christian Schumacher his paper on calculating longitude by the occultation of stars by the moon. In 1828, he discovered Clausen's formula. He eventually returned to Munich, where he conceived and published his best known works on mathematics. In 1832, he discovered the Clausen function. In 1842, Clausen was hired by the staff of the Tartu Observatory, becoming its director in 1866–1872.

Works by Clausen include studies on the stability of Solar System, comet movement, ABC telegraph code and calculation of 250 decimals of pi (later, only 248 were confirmed to be correct). In 1840, he discovered the Von Staudt–Clausen theorem. Also in 1840, he also found two compass and straightedge constructions of lunes with equal area to a square, adding to three (including the lune of Hippocrates) known to the ancient Greek mathematician Hippocrates of Chios; it was later shown that these five lunes are the only possible solutions to this problem. In 1854, he factored the sixth Fermat number as 2^{64}+1 = 67280421310721 × 274177.
