= Nijs Korevaar =

Dutch water polo player (1927–2016)

Personal information
- Born: 31 December 1927 Mijnsheerenland, the Netherlands
- Died: 1 December 2016 (aged 88)

Sport
- Sport: Water polo
- Club: Merwede, Dordrecht
Medal record
Representing the Netherlands
Olympic Games
Bronze medal – third place	1948 London	Team
European Championships
Gold medal – first place	1950 Vienna	Team

Nijs Cornelis Korevaar (31 December 1927 – 1 December 2016) was a Dutch water polo player who won a European title in 1950. He competed in the 1948 and 1952 Summer Olympics and won a bronze medal in 1948, placing fifth in 1952. In 1948 he played all seven matches and scored four goals, and in 1952 he played all nine matches and scored at least three goals (not all scorers are known). Korevaar is the younger brother of the mathematician Jacob Korevaar. His son Jan Jaap Korevaar also became an Olympic water polo competitor.

== See also ==
- List of Olympic medalists in water polo (men)
