= Helmut Grunsky =

German mathematician (1904–1986)

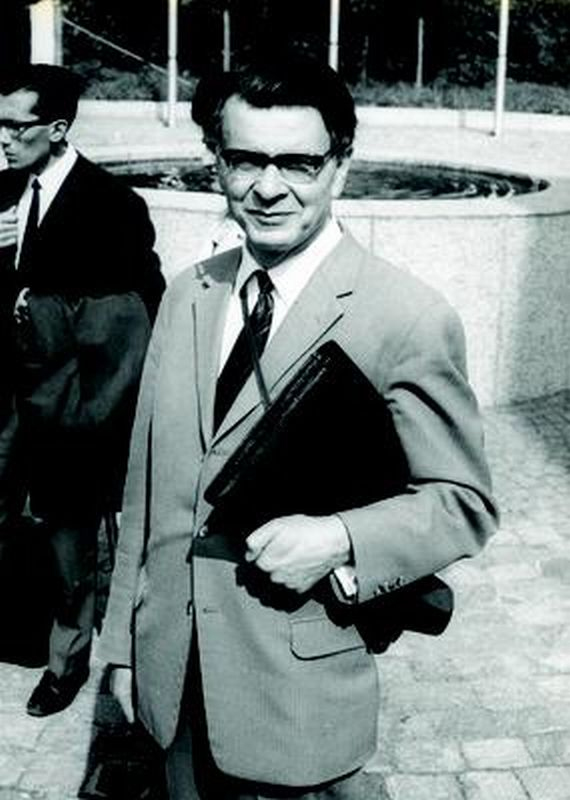
- Helmut Grunsky in Eichstätt in 1968
- Born: 11 July 1904; Aalen, Württemberg
- Died: 5 June 1986 (aged 81); Würzburg, Bavaria
- Education: University of Berlin
- Known for: Grunsky's theorem Grunsky inequalities
- Scientific career
- Fields: Mathematics
- Doctoral advisors: Ludwig Bieberbach; Issai Schur

Helmut Grunsky (11 July 1904 – 5 June 1986) was a German mathematician who worked in complex analysis and geometric function theory. He introduced Grunsky's theorem and the Grunsky inequalities.

In 1936, he was appointed editor of Jahrbuch über die Fortschritte der Mathematik. In 1939 he was forced to leave this position after Ludwig Bieberbach accused him of employing Jewish referees in a notorious letter. He joined the Nazi Party on 1 April 1940, though he seems to have had little sympathy with its philosophy. He published in the journal Deutsche Mathematik. From 1949 he was Privatdozent at the University of Tübingen; later, he was professor at the University of Mainz and at the University of Würzburg.

== Works ==
- Roth, Oliver; Ruscheweyh, Stephan, eds. (2004), Helmut Grunsky. Collected Papers (in German), Lemgo, Germany: Heldermann Verlag, ISBN 978-3-88538-501-1, MR 2083061
- Grunsky, Helmut (1978), Lectures on theory of functions in multiply connected domains, Studia mathematica: mathematische Lehrbücher, Göttingen: Vandenhoeck & Ruprecht, ISBN 3-525-40143-4
- Schur, Issai (1968), Grunsky, Helmut (ed.), Vorlesungen über Invariantentheorie, Die Grundlehren der mathematischen Wissenschaften (in German), vol. 143, Berlin, New York: Springer-Verlag, MR 0229674
- Grunsky, Helmut (1939), "Koeffizientenbedingungen für schlicht abbildende meromorphe Funktionen", Mathematische Zeitschrift (in German), 45: 29–61, doi:10.1007/bf01580272, S2CID 123606166
- Grunsky, Helmut (1932), Neue Abschätzungen zur konformen Abbildung ein- und mehrfach zusammenhängender Bereiche, Dissertation Friedrich-Wilhelms-Universität zu Berlin (in German), vol. Schriften des Mathematischen Seminars und des Instituts für angewandte Mathematik der Universität Berlin, Band 1, Heft 4, S. 95–140, Leipzig: B. G. Teubner

== Sources ==
- Roth, Oliver; Ruscheweyh, Stephan, eds. (2004), Helmut Grunsky. Collected Papers (in German), Lemgo, Germany: Heldermann Verlag, ISBN 978-3-88538-501-1, MR 2083061
- Siegmund-Schultze, Reinhard (2004), "Helmut Grunsky (1904–1986) in the Third Reich: A Mathematician Torn between Conformity and Dissent", in Roth, Oliver; Ruscheweyh, Stephan (eds.), Helmut Grunsky: Collected Papers, Lemgo: Heldermann, pp. XXXI–L, ISBN 978-3-88538-501-1, MR 2083061
- Jenkins, J. A. (1989), "Helmut Grunsky" (PDF), Jahresbericht der Deutschen Mathematiker-Vereinigung, 91 (4): 159–167, ISSN 0012-0456, MR 1027062
