= Robert Vorhoelzer =

German architect (1884–1954)

Rector of the Technical University of Munich
- In office 1946–1947
- Preceded by: Georg Faber
- Succeeded by: Ludwig Föppl

Personal details
- Born: June 13, 1884 Memmingen, German Empire
- Died: October 23, 1954 (aged 70) Munich, West Germany
- Education: Technical University of Munich

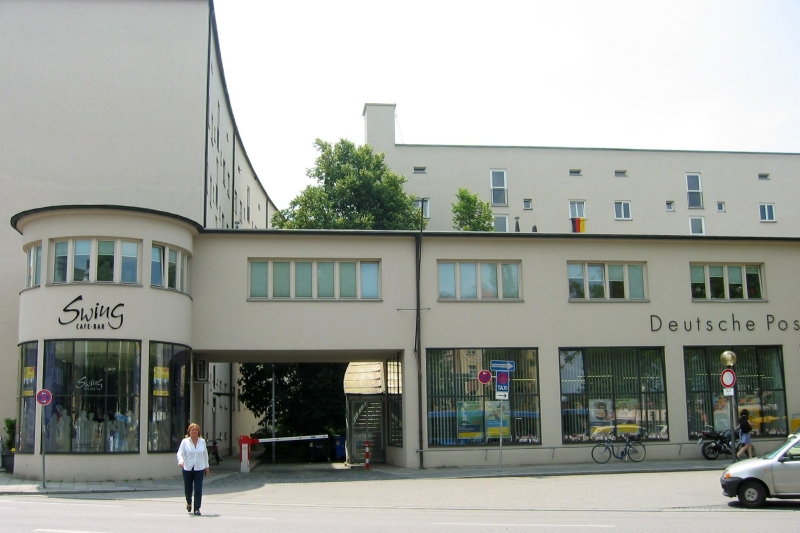
Vorhoelzer built post office at the Harras, Munich-Sendling

Robert Vorhoelzer (13 June 1884 – 23 October 1954) was a German architect.

Vorhoelzer belonged to the classical modernist school of architecture that is otherwise rather underrepresented in Bavaria. Most of his works were built when Vorhoelzer was Oberbaurat of the Bavarian postal administration. Together with Robert Poeverlein he founded the "Bayerische Postbauschule". In the early stages of his work, such as at the post office Penzberg or the post office on Ismaninger Straße in Munich, the influence of the "Heimatstil" was dominant. But later Vorhoelzer built many modern and functional buildings (post offices, depots, apartment buildings for postal staff etc.) in the style of Neue Sachlichkeit. These include, for example, the post office on Tegernseer Landstraße ("Tela-Post") in Munich-Obergiesing, the post office building at Goethe Platz or the post office at Harras place in Munich-Sendling (1931–32), a white office building with a rotunda and high rise apartment blocks in the background. The harmonious integration of his buildings in the surrounding urban landscape proves Vorhoelzer's ability as a city planner. In particular, the appearance of the Arnulfstraße in Munich owns much to the numerous Vorhoelzer buildings.

In 1930, Robert Vorhoelzer has been appointed professor at the Technical University of Munich. With the beginning of the Third Reich he lost his chair accused of being an "architectural bolshevist", although he resumed working as an architect and, for example, built the church "Mary Queen of Peace" in Obergiesing (1936–37). On the eve of World War II, Vorhoelzer emigrated to Turkey, from where he has been expelled in 1941 due to an allegation of espionage for Germany.

After the war, he retrieved his chair, but in 1947 he has been suspended again for six months after Nazi allegations concerning the date of the Turkish exile. In the post-war debate on the reconstruction of Munich, Vorhoelzer pointed out that parts of the city had been in need of rehabilitation even before the war. He called for a radical new development plan, in which Flachbauten low-rise and high-rise buildings played an important part. He also had been ahead of his times in his request to discuss the reconstruction in public. In 1952, Vorhoelzer retired and two years later, he died at the age of 70 years after an operation.

His last major work was the monumental parish church of St. Joseph in Dingolfing, which had only been completed 1954 to 1956 after his death. For this hall-type church, he applied motives that were already present in the church Giesinger "Mary Queen of Peace".
