= Georg Faber =

German mathematician (1877–1966)

Rector of the Technical University of Munich
- In office 1945–1946
- Preceded by: Hans Döllgast
- Succeeded by: Robert Vorhoelzer

Personal details
- Born: 5 April 1877 Kaiserslautern, German Empire
- Died: 7 March 1966 (aged 88) Munich, West Germany
- Education: LMU Munich; University of Göttingen; University of Würzburg
- Scientific career
- Thesis: Über Reihenentwickelungen analytischer Funktionen (1902)

Georg Faber (5 April 1877 – 7 March 1966) was a German mathematician who introduced Faber polynomials, Faber series, the Lévy C curve, and Faber–Schauder systems.
