= Yilin Wang =

Mathematician

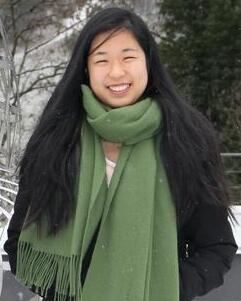
- Wang at Oberwolfach in 2019
- Born: 1991 (age 34–35); Shanghai, China
- Education: École normale supérieure Pierre and Marie Curie University (MSc); Paris-Sud University (MSc); ETH Zurich (PhD)
- Awards: Maryam Mirzakhani New Frontiers Prize (2022); Salem Prize (2024)
- Scientific career
- Fields: Mathematics
- Workplaces: Massachusetts Institute of Technology; Simons Laufer Mathematical Sciences Institute; Institut des Hautes Études Scientifiques; ETH Zurich
- Doctoral advisor: Wendelin Werner

Yilin Wang (Chinese: 王艺霖; born 1991) is a mathematician whose research has involved complex analysis and probability theory, including Teichmüller theory, the Schramm–Loewner evolution, and Loewner energy. Originally from China, and educated in France and Switzerland, she is a junior professor at the Institut des Hautes Études Scientifiques in France and has accepted a position at ETH Zurich in Switzerland starting in July 2025.

== Education and career ==
Wang was born in Shanghai in 1991 and attended Shanghai Foreign Language School where she elected to learn French as a foreign language. In Wang's third year of high school, the French Ministry of Education held a recruiting campaign in China for students who excelled in mathematics. While Wang did not score particularly well on the recruitment exam, she was the only student to answer her questionnaire in French rather than English.This caught the attention of the interviewers and she was eventually accepted into the programme.

After classes prépas at the Lycée du Parc in Lyon, Wang entered the École normale supérieure (Paris) in 2011. She earned a master's degree in fundamental mathematics at Pierre and Marie Curie University in Paris in 2014 and a second master's degree in probability and statistics at Paris-Sud University in 2015. She completed a Ph.D. at ETH Zurich in 2019 with the dissertation On the Loewner energy of simple planar curves supervised by Wendelin Werner.

She spent three years as a C.L.E. Moore Instructor at the Massachusetts Institute of Technology, including a one-semester leave as Strauch Postdoctoral fellow at the Simons Laufer Mathematical Sciences Institute in Berkeley, California. Next, she became a junior professor at the Institut des Hautes Études Scientifiques in 2022, the institute's first junior professor. In 2024, she was appointed to a position as associate professor at ETH Zurich.

== Recognition ==
Wang was a 2022 recipient of the Maryam Mirzakhani New Frontiers Prize, given "for innovative and far-reaching work on the Loewner energy of planar curves".

She is one of two 2024 recipients of the Salem Prize, given "for developing deep novel connections between complex analysis, probability, and mathematical physics, particularly with regards to Teichmuller theory and the theory of the Schramm–Loewner evolution".
