= Jacob Korevaar =

Dutch mathematician (1923–2025)

- Born: 25 January 1923; Lange Ruige Weide, Netherlands
- Died: 18 March 2025 (aged 102); Bussum, Netherlands
- Education: University of Leiden
- Relatives: Nijs Korevaar (brother)
- Awards: Chauvenet Prize (1989); Lester R. Ford Award (1987)
- Scientific career
- Fields: Mathematics
- Workplaces: University of Amsterdam; University of California San Diego; University of Wisconsin–Madison
- Doctoral advisor: Hendrik Kloosterman

Jacob "Jaap" Korevaar (25 January 1923 – 18 March 2025) was a Dutch mathematician. He was part of the faculty of the University of California San Diego and University of Wisconsin–Madison, as well as the University of Amsterdam (Korteweg-de Vries Institute for Mathematics).

Korevaar became a member of the Royal Netherlands Academy of Arts and Sciences in 1975. He won the 1987 Lester R. Ford Award, and the 1989 Chauvenet Prize, for an essay on Louis de Branges de Bourcia's proof of the Bieberbach conjecture. In 2012, he became a fellow of the American Mathematical Society.

Korevaar was the older brother of the Olympic water polo player Nijs Korevaar. He died in Bussum on 18 March 2025, at the age of 102.

== Sources ==
- Prof. dr. J. Korevaar, 1923 - at the University of Amsterdam Album Academicum website
