= Nevanlinna's criterion =

Characterization of starlike univalent holomorphic functions

In mathematics, Nevanlinna's criterion in complex analysis, proved in 1920 by the Finnish mathematician Rolf Nevanlinna, characterizes holomorphic univalent functions on the unit disk which are starlike. Nevanlinna used this criterion to prove the Bieberbach conjecture for starlike univalent functions.

== Statement of criterion ==
A univalent function h on the unit disk satisfying h(0) = 0 and h'(0) = 1 is starlike, i.e. has image invariant under multiplication by real numbers in [0,1], if and only if $z h^\prime(z)/h(z)$ has positive real part for |z| < 1 and takes the value 1 at 0.

Note that, by applying the result to a•h(rz), the criterion applies on any disc |z| < r with only the requirement that f(0) = 0 and f'(0) ≠ 0.

== Proof of criterion ==
Let h(z) be a starlike univalent function on |z| < 1 with h(0) = 0 and h'(0) = 1.

For t < 0, define

$$f_t(z)=h^{-1}(e^{-t}h(z)), \,$$

a semigroup of holomorphic mappings of D into itself fixing 0.

Moreover h is the Koenigs function for the semigroup f_{t}.

By the Schwarz lemma, |f_{t}(z)| decreases as t increases.

Hence

$$\partial_t |f_t(z)|^2 \le 0.$$

But, setting w = f_{t}(z),

$$\partial_t |f_t(z)|^2 =2\Re\, \overline{f_t(z)} \partial_t f_t(z) = 2 \Re\, \overline{w} v(w),$$

where

$$v(w)= -{h(w)\over h^\prime(w)}.$$

Hence

$$\Re\, \overline{w} {h(w)\over h^\prime (w)} \ge 0.$$

and so, dividing by |w|^{2},

$$\Re\, {h(w)\over w h^\prime (w)} \ge 0.$$

Taking reciprocals and letting t go to 0 gives

$$\Re\, z {h^\prime(z)\over h(z)} \ge  0$$

for all |z| < 1. Since the left hand side is a harmonic function, the maximum principle implies the inequality is strict.

Conversely if

$$g(z) =z {h^\prime(z)\over h(z)}$$

has positive real part and g(0) = 1, then h can vanish only at 0, where it must have a simple zero.

Now

$$\partial_\theta \arg h(re^{i\theta})=\partial_\theta \Im\, \log h(z) = \Im\, \partial_\theta \log h(z)=\Im\, {\partial z\over \partial\theta} \cdot \partial_z \log h(z) =\Re\, z {h^\prime(z)\over h(z)}.$$

Thus as z traces the circle $z=re^{i\theta}$, the argument of the image $h(re^{i\theta})$ increases strictly. By the argument principle, since $h$ has a simple zero at 0, it circles the origin just once. The interior of the region bounded by the curve it traces is therefore starlike. If a is a point in the interior then the number of solutions N(a) of h(z) = a with |z| < r is given by

$$N(a) ={1\over 2\pi i} \int_{|z|=r} {h^\prime(z) \over h(z)-a}\, dz.$$

Since this is an integer, depends continuously on a and N(0) = 1, it is identically 1. So h is univalent and starlike in each disk |z| < r and hence everywhere.

== Application to Bieberbach conjecture ==
=== Carathéodory's lemma ===
Constantin Carathéodory proved in 1907 that if

$$g(z)= 1 +b_1 z + b_2 z^2 + \cdots.$$

is a holomorphic function on the unit disk D with positive real part, then

$$|b_n|\le 2.$$

In fact it suffices to show the result with g replaced by g_{r}(z) = g(rz) for any r < 1 and then pass to the limit r = 1. In that case g extends to a continuous function on the closed disc with positive real part and by Schwarz formula

$$g(z) = {1\over 2\pi} \int_0^{2\pi} { e^{i\theta}+  z\over e^{i\theta} -z} \Re g(e^{i\theta})\, d\theta.$$

Using the identity

$${ e^{i\theta}+  z\over e^{i\theta} -z} = 1 +2 \sum_{n\ge 1} e^{-in\theta} z^n,$$

it follows that

$$\int_0^{2\pi}  \Re g(e^{i\theta}) \,d\theta =1$$,

so defines a probability measure, and

$$b_n =2\int_0^{2\pi} e^{-int} \Re g(e^{i\theta}) \,d\theta.$$

Hence

$$|b_n| \le 2 \int_0^{2\pi} \Re g(e^{i\theta}) \,d\theta =2.$$

=== Proof for starlike functions ===
Let

$$f(z) = z + a_2 z^2 + a_3 z^3 + \cdots$$

be a univalent starlike function in |z| < 1. Nevanlinna (1921) proved that

$$|a_n|\le n.$$

In fact by Nevanlinna's criterion

$$g(z) = z{f^\prime(z)\over f(z)} = 1 + b_1 z + b_2 z^2 + \cdots$$

has positive real part for |z|<1. So by Carathéodory's lemma

$$|b_n|\le 2.$$

On the other hand

$$z f^\prime(z) = g(z) f(z)$$

gives the recurrence relation

$$(n-1) a_n = \sum_{k=1}^{n-1} b_{n-k}a_k.$$

where a_{1} = 1. Thus

$$|a_n|\le {2\over n-1} \sum_{k=1}^{n-1} |a_k|,$$

so it follows by induction that

$$|a_n|\le n.$$
