= Lebedev–Milin inequality =

Inequality on the coefficients of the exponential of a power series

In mathematics, the Lebedev–Milin inequality is any of several inequalities for the coefficients of the exponential of a power series, found by Lebedev and Milin (1965) and Isaak Moiseevich Milin (1977). It was used in the proof of the Bieberbach conjecture, as it shows that the Milin conjecture implies the Robertson conjecture.

They state that if

$$\sum_{k\ge 0} \beta_kz^k = \exp\left(\sum_{k\ge 1} \alpha_kz^k\right)$$

for complex numbers $\beta_k$ and $\alpha_k$, and $n$ is a positive integer, then

$$\sum_{k=0}^{\infty}|\beta_k|^2 \le
\exp\left(\sum_{k=1}^\infty k|\alpha_k|^2\right),$$

$$\sum_{k=0}^{n}|\beta_k|^2 \le
(n+1)\exp\left(\frac{1}{n+1}\sum_{m=1}^{n}\sum_{k=1}^m(k|\alpha_k|^2 - 1/k)\right),$$

$$|\beta_n|^2 \le
\exp\left(\sum_{k=1}^n(k|\alpha_k|^2 -1/k)\right).$$

See also exponential formula (on exponentiation of power series).
