= Jan Jaap Korevaar =

Dutch water polo player (born 1957)

Personal information
- Born: May 22, 1957 (age 68); Delft, Netherlands

Sport
- Sport: Water polo

Jan Jaap Korevaar (born May 22, 1957) is a former water polo player from the Netherlands. He finished in sixth position with the Dutch team at the 1980 Summer Olympics in Moscow.
