= Koebe quarter theorem =

Statement in complex analysis

In complex analysis, a branch of mathematics, the Koebe 1/4 theorem states the following:

Koebe Quarter Theorem. The image of an injective analytic function $f:\mathbf{D}\to\mathbb{C}$ from the unit disk $\mathbf{D}$ onto a subset of the complex plane contains the disk whose center is $f(0)$ and whose radius is $|f'(0)|/4$.

The theorem is named after Paul Koebe, who conjectured the result in 1907. The theorem was proven by Ludwig Bieberbach in 1916. The example of the Koebe function shows that the constant $1/4$ in the theorem cannot be improved (increased).

A related result is the Schwarz lemma, and a notion related to both is conformal radius.

== Grönwall's area theorem ==
Suppose that

$$g(z) = z +b_1z^{-1} + b_2 z^{-2} + \cdots$$

is univalent in $|z|>1$. Then

$$\sum_{n=1}^\infty n|b_n|^2 \le 1.$$

In fact, if $r > 1$, the complement of the image of the disk $|z|>r$ is a bounded domain $X(r)$. Its area is given by

$$\int_{X(r)} dx\,dy = {1\over 2i} \int_{\partial X(r)}\overline{z}\,dz = {1\over 2i}\int_{|z|=r}\overline{g}\,dg=\pi r^2 - \pi\sum_{n=1}^\infty n|b_n|^2 r^{-2n}.$$

Since the area is positive, the result follows by letting $r$ decrease to $1$. The above proof shows equality holds if and only if the complement of the image of $g$ has zero area, i.e. Lebesgue measure zero.

This result was proved in 1914 by the Swedish mathematician Thomas Hakon Grönwall.

== Koebe function ==
The Koebe function is defined by

$$f(z)=\frac{z}{(1 - z)^2}=\sum_{n=1}^\infty n z^n$$

Application of the theorem to this function shows that the constant $1/4$ in the theorem cannot be improved, as the image domain $f(\mathbf{D})$ does not contain the point $z=-1/4$ and so cannot contain any disk centred at $0$ with radius larger than $1/4$.

The rotated Koebe function is

$$f_\alpha(z)=\frac{z}{(1-\alpha z)^2}=\sum_{n=1}^\infty n\alpha^{n-1} z^n$$

with $\alpha$ a complex number of absolute value $1$. The Koebe function and its rotations are schlicht: that is, univalent (analytic and one-to-one) and satisfying $f(0)=0$ and $f'(0)=1$.

== Bieberbach's coefficient inequality for univalent functions ==
Let

$$g(z) = z + a_2z^2 + a_3 z^3 + \cdots$$

be univalent in $|z|<1$. Then

$$|a_2|\le 2.$$

This follows by applying Gronwall's area theorem to the odd univalent function

$$g(z^{-2})^{-1/2}= z -{1\over 2} a_2 z^{-1} + \cdots.$$

Equality holds if and only if $g$ is a rotated Koebe function.

This result was proved by Ludwig Bieberbach in 1916 and provided the basis for his celebrated conjecture that $|a_n|\leq n$, proved in 1985 by Louis de Branges.

== Proof of quarter theorem ==
Applying an affine map, it can be assumed that

$$f(0)=0,\,\,\, f^\prime(0)=1,$$

so that

$$f(z) = z + a_2 z^2 + \cdots .$$

In particular, the coefficient inequality gives that $|a_2| \le 2$. If $w$ is not in $f(\mathbf{D})$, then

$$h(z)={wf(z)\over w-f(z)} = z +(a_2+w^{-1}) z^2 + \cdots$$

is univalent in $|z|<1$.

Applying the coefficient inequality to $h$ gives

$$|w|^{-1} = |w^{-1}| = |-a_2 + a_2 + w^{-1}| \le |a_2| + |a_2 + w^{-1}|\le 4,$$

so that

$$|w|\ge {1\over 4}.$$

== Koebe distortion theorem ==
The Koebe distortion theorem gives a series of bounds for a univalent function and its derivative. It is a direct consequence of Bieberbach's inequality for the second coefficient and the Koebe quarter theorem.

Let $f(z)$ be a univalent function on $|z|<1$ normalized so that $f(0)=0$ and $f'(0)=1$ and let $r=|z|$. Then

$${r \over (1+r)^2}\le |f(z)|\le {r\over (1-r)^2}$$

$${1-r\over (1+r)^3} \le |f^\prime(z)| \le {1+r\over (1-r)^3}$$

$${1-r\over 1+r} \le \left|z{f^\prime(z)\over f(z)}\right| \le {1+r\over 1-r}$$

with equality if and only if $f$ is a Koebe function

$$f(z) ={z\over(1-e^{i\theta}z)^2}.$$
