= De Branges's theorem =

Statement in complex analysis; formerly the Bieberbach conjecture

In complex analysis, de Branges's theorem, or the Bieberbach conjecture, is a theorem that gives a necessary condition on a holomorphic function in order for it to map the open unit disk of the complex plane injectively to the complex plane. It was posed by Ludwig Bieberbach (1916) and finally proven by Louis de Branges (1985).

The statement concerns the Taylor coefficients $a_n$ of a univalent function, i.e., a one-to-one holomorphic function that maps the unit disk into the complex plane, normalized as is always possible so that $a_0=0$ and $a_1=1$. That is, we consider a function defined on the open unit disk which is holomorphic and injective (univalent) with Taylor series of the form

$$f(z)=z+\sum_{n\geq 2} a_n z^n.$$

Such functions are called schlicht [German for "natural, simple"]. The theorem then states that

$$|a_n| \leq n \quad \text{for all }n\geq 2.$$

The Koebe function (see below) is a function $a_n=n$ for all $n$, and it is schlicht, so the inequality bounding the $n$th coefficient is sharp.

== Schlicht functions ==
The normalizations

$$a_0=0 \ \text{and}\ a_1=1$$

mean that

$$f(0)=0\ \text{and}\ f'(0)=1 .$$

This can always be obtained by an affine transformation: starting with an arbitrary injective holomorphic function $g$ defined on the open unit disk and setting

$$f(z)=\frac{g(z)-g(0)}{g'(0)}.$$

Such functions $g$ are of interest because they appear in the Riemann mapping theorem.

A schlicht function is defined as an analytic function $f$ that is one-to-one and satisfies $f(0)=0$ and $f'(0)=1$. A family of schlicht functions are the rotated Koebe functions

$$f_\alpha(z)=\frac{z}{(1-\alpha z)^2}=\sum_{n=1}^\infty n\alpha^{n-1} z^n$$

with $\alpha$ a complex number of absolute value $1$. If $f$ is a schlicht function and $|a_n|=n$ for some $n\geq 2$, then $f$ is a rotated Koebe function.

The condition of de Branges' theorem is not sufficient to show the function is schlicht, as the function

$$f(z)=z+z^2 = (z+1/2)^2 - 1/4$$

shows: it is holomorphic on the unit disc and satisfies $|a_n|\leq n$ for all $n$, but it is not injective since $f(-1/2+z) = f(-1/2-z)$.

== History ==
A survey of the history is given by Koepf (2007).

Bieberbach (1916) proved $|a_2|\leq 2$, and stated the conjecture that $|a_n|\leq n$. Löwner (1917) and Nevanlinna (1921) independently proved the conjecture for starlike functions. Then Charles Loewner (Löwner (1923)) proved $|a_3|\leq 3$, using the Löwner differential equation. His work was utilized in most later attempts and is also applied in the theory of Schramm–Loewner evolution.

Littlewood (1925, theorem 20) proved that $|a_n|\leq en$ for all $n$, showing that the Bieberbach conjecture is true up to a factor of $e=2.718\ldots$ Several authors later reduced the constant in the inequality below $e$.

If $f(z)=z+\cdots$ is a schlicht function then $\varphi(z) = z(f(z^2)/z^2)^{1/2}$ is an odd schlicht function. Littlewood and Paley (1932) showed that its Taylor coefficients satisfy $b_k\leq 14$ for all $k$. They conjectured that $14$ can be replaced by $1$ as a natural generalization of the Bieberbach conjecture. The Littlewood–Paley conjecture easily implies the Bieberbach conjecture using the Cauchy inequality (also known as Cauchy's estimate) but it was soon disproved by Fekete & Szegő (1933), who showed there is an odd schlicht function with $b_5=1/2+\exp(-2/3)=1.013\ldots$, and that this is the maximum possible value of $b_5$. Isaak Milin later showed that $14$ can be replaced by $1.14$, and Hayman showed that the numbers $b_k$ have a limit less than $1$ if $f$ is not a Koebe function (for which the $b_{2k+1}$ are all $1$). So the limit is always less than or equal to $1$, meaning that Littlewood and Paley's conjecture is true for all but a finite number of coefficients. A weaker form of Littlewood and Paley's conjecture was discovered by Robertson (1936).

The Robertson conjecture states that if

$$\phi(z) = b_1z+b_3z^3+b_5z^5+\cdots$$

is an odd schlicht function in the unit disk with $b_1=1$ then for all positive integers $n$,

$$\sum_{k=1}^n|b_{2k+1}|^2\le n.$$

Robertson observed that his conjecture is still strong enough to imply the Bieberbach conjecture and proved it for $n=3$. This conjecture introduced the important idea of limiting different quadratic functions of the coefficients instead of just the coefficients themselves, which is the same as setting limits on the sizes of certain elements in specific Hilbert spaces of schlicht functions.

There were several proofs of the Bieberbach conjecture for certain higher values of $n$, in particular, Garabedian & Schiffer (1955) proved $|a_4|\leq 4$, Ozawa (1969) and Pederson (1968) proved $|a_6|\leq 6$, and Pederson & Schiffer (1972) proved $|a_5|\leq 5$.

Hayman (1955) proved that the limit of $a_n/n$ exists, and has an absolute value less than $1$ unless $f$ is a Koebe function. In particular, this showed that for any $f$ there can be at most a finite number of exceptions to the Bieberbach conjecture.

The Milin conjecture states that for each schlicht function on the unit disk, and for all positive integers $n$,

$$\sum^n_{k=1} (n-k+1)(k|\gamma_k|^2-1/k)\le 0$$

where the logarithmic coefficients $\gamma_n$ of $f$ are given by

$$\log(f(z)/z)=2 \sum^\infty_{n=1}\gamma_nz^n.$$

Milin (1977) showed using the Lebedev–Milin inequality that the Milin conjecture (later proved by de Branges) implies the Robertson conjecture and therefore the Bieberbach conjecture.

Finally de Branges (1987) proved $|a_n|\leq n$ for all $n$.

== De Branges's proof ==
The proof uses a type of Hilbert space of entire functions. The study of these spaces grew into a sub-field of complex analysis, and the spaces have come to be called de Branges spaces. De Branges proved the stronger Milin conjecture (Milin 1977) on logarithmic coefficients. This was already known to imply the Robertson conjecture (Robertson 1936) about odd univalent functions, which in turn was known to imply the Bieberbach conjecture about schlicht functions (Bieberbach 1916). His proof uses the Loewner equation, the Askey–Gasper inequality about Jacobi polynomials, and the Lebedev–Milin inequality on exponentiated power series.

In 1983-84, De Branges was writing a book, one chapter of which was on the Bieberbach conjecture. He was surprised by the calculations, which were close to proving the conjecture. Let
$$\begin{aligned}
F_{n, k}(x) &:= \int_0^1 t^{n-k-1/2} P_k^{(2n-2k, 1)}(1-2tx) \, dt > 0 \\
&\qquad \text{for } \quad k=0,1,2, \ldots, n-1
\end{aligned}$$
where $P_k^{(\alpha, \beta)}$ is the Jacobi polynomial of degree $k$ with parameters $\alpha, \beta$. $F_{n, k}$ is a polynomial of degree k, and it is a hypergeometric series with rational coefficients (the precise coefficients can be derived using the hypergeometric series for Jacobi polynomials).

He showed that if $F_{n, k}(x) > 0$ for $0 < x < 1$ and $k = 0, 1, \dots, n-1$, then $|a_{n+1}| \leq n+1$. He verified this for $n = 2, 3, 4, 5, 6$ by hand, finding it too laborious to continue. He asked Walter Gautschi for help, who verified more of these inequalities by Gauss–Jacobi quadrature on a CDC 6500, reaching up to $n=30$. and then asked Richard Askey whether he knew of any similar inequalities. Askey pointed out that Askey & Gasper (1976) had proved the necessary inequalities eight years before, which allowed de Branges to complete his proof. The first version was very long and had some minor mistakes, which caused some skepticism about it, but these were corrected with the help of members of the Leningrad seminar on Geometric Function Theory (Leningrad Department of Steklov Mathematical Institute) when de Branges visited in 1984.

De Branges proved the following result, which for $\nu=0$ implies the Milin conjecture (and therefore the Bieberbach conjecture). Suppose that $\nu > -3/2$ and $\sigma_n$ are real numbers for positive integers $n$ with limit $0$ and such that

$$\rho_n=\frac{\Gamma(2\nu+n+1)}{\Gamma(n+1)}(\sigma_n-\sigma_{n+1})$$

is non-negative, non-increasing, and has limit $0$. Then for all Riemann mapping functions $F(z)=z+\cdots$ univalent in the unit disk with

$$\frac{F(z)^\nu-z^\nu} {\nu}= \sum_{n=1}^{\infty} a_nz^{\nu+n}$$

the maximum value of

$$\sum_{n=1}^\infty(\nu+n)\sigma_n|a_n|^2$$

is achieved by the Koebe function $z/(1-z)^2$.

A simplified version of the proof was published in 1985 by Carl FitzGerald and Christian Pommerenke (FitzGerald & Pommerenke (1985)), and an even shorter description by Jacob Korevaar (Korevaar (1986)). A very short proof avoiding use of the inequalities of Askey and Gasper was later found by Lenard Weinstein (Weinstein (1991)).

== See also ==
- Grunsky matrix
- Fekete–Szegő inequality
- Schwarz lemma
