= Geometric function theory =

Study of space and shapes locally given by a convergent power series

Geometric function theory is the study of geometric properties of analytic functions. A fundamental result in the theory is the Riemann mapping theorem.

== Topics in geometric function theory ==
The following are some of the most important topics in geometric function theory:

=== Conformal maps ===
A rectangular grid (top) and its image under a conformal map f (bottom). It is seen that f maps pairs of lines intersecting at 90° to pairs of curves still intersecting at 90°.

A conformal map is a function which preserves angles locally. In the most common case the function has a domain and range in the complex plane.

More formally, a map,

$f: U \rightarrow V\qquad$ with $U,V \subset \mathbb{C}^n$

is called conformal (or angle-preserving) at a point $u_0$ if it preserves oriented angles between curves through $u_0$ with respect to their orientation (i.e., not just the magnitude of the angle). Conformal maps preserve both angles and the shapes of infinitesimally small figures, but not necessarily their size or curvature.

=== Quasiconformal maps ===
In mathematical complex analysis, a quasiconformal mapping, introduced by Grötzsch (1928) and named by Ahlfors (1935), is a homeomorphism between plane domains which to first order takes small circles to small ellipses of bounded eccentricity.

Intuitively, let f : D → D′ be an orientation-preserving homeomorphism between open sets in the plane. If f is continuously differentiable, then it is K-quasiconformal if the derivative of f at every point maps circles to ellipses with eccentricity bounded by K.

If K is 0, then the function is conformal.

=== Analytic continuation ===
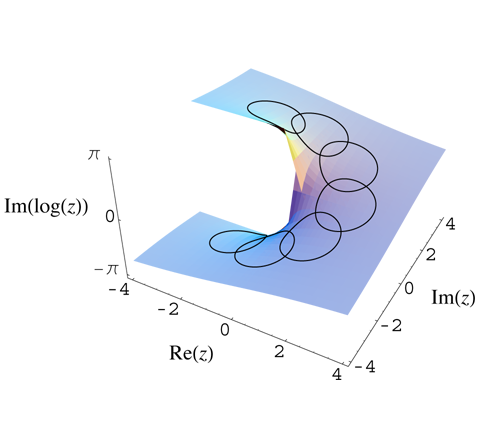
Analytic continuation of natural logarithm (imaginary part)

Analytic continuation is a technique to extend the domain of a given analytic function. Analytic continuation often succeeds in defining further values of a function, for example in a new region where an infinite series representation in terms of which it is initially defined becomes divergent.

The step-wise continuation technique may, however, come up against difficulties. These may have an essentially topological nature, leading to inconsistencies (defining more than one value). They may alternatively have to do with the presence of mathematical singularities. The case of several complex variables is rather different, since singularities then cannot be isolated points, and its investigation was a major reason for the development of sheaf cohomology.

=== Geometric properties of polynomials and algebraic functions ===
Topics in this area include Riemann surfaces for algebraic functions and zeros for algebraic functions.

==== Riemann surface ====
A Riemann surface, first studied by and named after Bernhard Riemann, is a one-dimensional complex manifold. Riemann surfaces can be thought of as deformed versions of the complex plane: locally near every point they look like patches of the complex plane, but the global topology can be quite different. For example, they can look like a sphere or a torus or several sheets glued together.

The main point of Riemann surfaces is that holomorphic functions may be defined between them. Riemann surfaces are nowadays considered the natural setting for studying the global behavior of these functions, especially multi-valued functions such as the square root and other algebraic functions, or the logarithm.

=== Extremal problems ===
Topics in this area include "Maximum principle; Schwarz's lemma, Lindelöf principle, analogues and generalizations".

=== Univalent and multivalent functions ===
A holomorphic function on an open subset of the complex plane is called univalent if it is injective.

One can prove that if $G$ and $\Omega$ are two open connected sets in the complex plane, and

$$f: G \to \Omega$$

is a univalent function such that $f(G) = \Omega$ (that is, $f$ is surjective), then the derivative of $f$ is never zero, $f$ is invertible, and its inverse $f^{-1}$ is also holomorphic. More, one has by the chain rule

Alternate terms in common use are schlicht( this is German for plain, simple) and simple. It is a remarkable fact, fundamental to the theory of univalent functions, that univalence is essentially preserved under uniform convergence.

== Important theorems ==
=== Riemann mapping theorem ===
Let $z_0$ be a point in a simply-connected region $D_1 (D_1 \neq \mathbb{C})$ and $D_1$ having at least two boundary points. Then there exists a unique analytic function $w=f(z)$ mapping $D_1$ bijectively into the open unit disk $|w| < 1$ such that $f(z_0)=0$ and $f'(z_0) > 0$.

Although Riemann's mapping theorem demonstrates the existence of a mapping function, it does not actually exhibit this function. An example is given below.

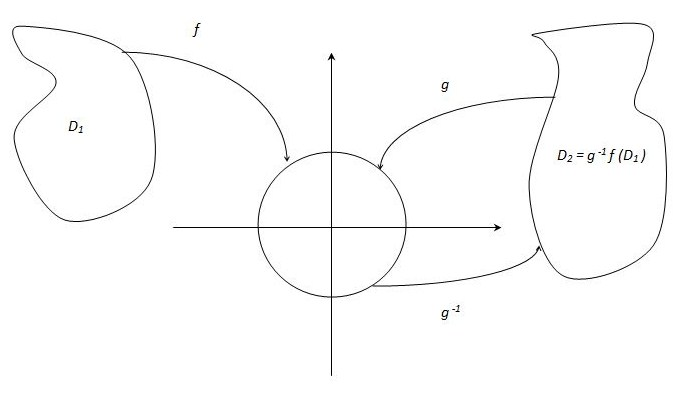

In the above figure, consider $D_1$ and $D_2$ as two simply connected regions different from $\mathbb C$. The Riemann mapping theorem provides the existence of $w=f(z)$ mapping $D_1$ onto the unit disk and existence of $w=g(z)$ mapping $D_2$ onto the unit disk. Thus $g^{-1}f$ is a one-to-one mapping of $D_1$ onto $D_2$. If we can show that $g^{-1}$, and consequently the composition, is analytic, we then have a conformal mapping of $D_1$ onto $D_2$, proving "any two simply connected regions different from the whole plane $\mathbb C$ can be mapped conformally onto each other."

=== Schwarz's Lemma ===
The Schwarz lemma, named after Hermann Amandus Schwarz, is a result in complex analysis about holomorphic functions from the open unit disk to itself. The lemma is less celebrated than stronger theorems, such as the Riemann mapping theorem, which it helps to prove. It is however one of the simplest results capturing the rigidity of holomorphic functions.

==== Statement ====
Schwarz Lemma. Let D = {z : |z| < 1} be the open unit disk in the complex plane C centered at the origin and let f : D → D be a holomorphic map such that f(0) = 0.

Then, |f(z)| ≤ |z| for all z in D and |f′(0)| ≤ 1.

Moreover, if |f(z)| = |z| for some non-zero z or if |f′(0)| = 1, then f(z) = az for some a in C with |a| (necessarily) equal to 1.

=== Maximum principle ===
The maximum principle is a property of solutions to certain partial differential equations, of the elliptic and parabolic types. Roughly speaking, it says that the maximum of a function in a domain is to be found on the boundary of that domain. Specifically, the strong maximum principle says that if a function achieves its maximum in the interior of the domain, the function is uniformly a constant. The weak maximum principle says that the maximum of the function is to be found on the boundary, but may re-occur in the interior as well. Other, even weaker maximum principles exist which merely bound a function in terms of its maximum on the boundary.

=== Riemann-Hurwitz formula ===
the Riemann–Hurwitz formula, named after Bernhard Riemann and Adolf Hurwitz, describes the relationship of the Euler characteristics of two surfaces when one is a ramified covering of the other. It therefore connects ramification with algebraic topology, in this case. It is a prototype result for many others, and is often applied in the theory of Riemann surfaces (which is its origin) and algebraic curves.

==== Statement ====
For an orientable surface S the Euler characteristic χ(S) is

$$2-2g \,$$

where g is the genus (the number of handles), since the Betti numbers are 1, 2g, 1, 0, 0, ... . In the case of an (unramified) covering map of surfaces

$$\pi:S' \to S \,$$

that is surjective and of degree N, we should have the formula

$$\chi(S') = N\cdot\chi(S). \,$$

That is because each simplex of S should be covered by exactly N in S′ — at least if we use a fine enough triangulation of S, as we are entitled to do since the Euler characteristic is a topological invariant. What the Riemann–Hurwitz formula does is to add in a correction to allow for ramification (sheets coming together).

Now assume that S and S′ are Riemann surfaces, and that the map π is complex analytic. The map π is said to be ramified at a point P in S′ if there exist analytic coordinates near P and π(P) such that π takes the form π(z) = z^{n}, and n > 1. An equivalent way of thinking about this is that there exists a small neighborhood U of P such that π(P) has exactly one preimage in U, but the image of any other point in U has exactly n preimages in U. The number n is called the ramification index at P and also denoted by e_{P}. In calculating the Euler characteristic of S′ we notice the loss of e_{P} − 1 copies of P above π(P) (that is, in the inverse image of π(P)). Now let us choose triangulations of S and S′ with vertices at the branch and ramification points, respectively, and use these to compute the Euler characteristics. Then S′ will have the same number of d-dimensional faces for d different from zero, but fewer than expected vertices. Therefore, we find a "corrected" formula

$$\chi(S') = N\cdot\chi(S) - \sum_{P\in S'} (e_P -1)$$

(all but finitely many P have e_{P} = 1, so this is quite safe). This formula is known as the Riemann–Hurwitz formula and also as Hurwitz's theorem.
