= Louis de Branges de Bourcia =

French-American mathematician

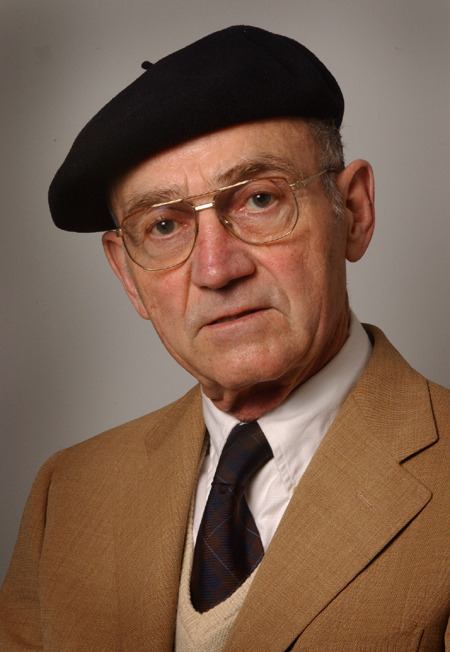
- Born: August 21, 1932 (age 94); Paris, France
- Education: Cornell University; Massachusetts Institute of Technology
- Scientific career
- Fields: Mathematics
- Workplaces: Purdue University
- Doctoral advisor: Harry Pollard; Wolfgang Fuchs

Louis de Branges de Bourcia (born August 21, 1932) is a French-American mathematician. He was the Edward C. Elliott Distinguished Professor of Mathematics at Purdue University in West Lafayette, Indiana, retiring in 2023. He is best known for proving the long-standing Bieberbach conjecture in 1984, now called de Branges's theorem. He claims to have proved several important conjectures in mathematics, including the generalized Riemann hypothesis.

Born to American parents who lived in Paris, de Branges moved to the US in 1941 with his mother and sisters. His native language is French. He did his undergraduate studies at the Massachusetts Institute of Technology (1949–53), and received a PhD in mathematics from Cornell University (1953–57). His advisors were Wolfgang Fuchs and then-future Purdue colleague Harry Pollard. He spent two years (1959–60) at the Institute for Advanced Study and another two (1961–62) at the Courant Institute of Mathematical Sciences. He was appointed to Purdue in 1962.

An analyst, de Branges has made incursions into real, functional, complex, harmonic (Fourier) and Diophantine analyses. As far as particular techniques and approaches are concerned, he is an expert in spectral and operator theories.

== Mathematical work ==
De Branges worked primarily in mathematical analysis, including complex analysis, functional analysis, operator theory and spectral theory. He is particularly associated with the theory of Hilbert spaces of entire functions, which he developed in a series of papers beginning in the late 1950s and subsequently presented in his 1968 monograph Hilbert Spaces of Entire Functions. The theory was conceived as a generalization of Fourier analysis, with Paley–Wiener spaces as a motivating example.

A de Branges space, conventionally denoted ℋ(E), is a reproducing kernel Hilbert space of entire functions satisfying axioms involving evaluation at non-real points, conjugation, and the displacement of non-real zeros. Such spaces can be represented in terms of an entire Hermite–Biehler function E. De Branges's theory relates entire-function theory to Hilbert-space operator theory, moment problems, differential systems and spectral theory.

=== Canonical systems and spectral theory ===
The theory of de Branges spaces is closely connected with canonical systems, first-order differential systems used in spectral theory. A fundamental inverse theorem of de Branges states, in a standard trace normalization, that every Herglotz–Nevanlinna function occurs as the Weyl–Titchmarsh function of a canonical system, with the normalized correspondence being unique. The result forms part of the modern inverse spectral theory of canonical systems.

Canonical systems provide a common framework for spectral problems associated with operators and differential equations including Schrödinger operators, Jacobi operators, Dirac operators and Sturm–Liouville equations. De Branges spaces consequently became an important tool in direct and inverse spectral theory.

=== De Branges–Rovnyak spaces ===
In work with James Rovnyak, de Branges introduced another family of Hilbert spaces of analytic functions, now called de Branges–Rovnyak spaces and commonly denoted ℋ(b). They originated in the study of canonical models for contractions on Hilbert space and subsequently became tools in complex analysis and operator theory.

The spaces have continued to be studied in connection with invariant subspaces, function theory, interpolation and systems and control theory.

=== Bieberbach conjecture ===
De Branges is best known for his proof of the Bieberbach conjecture, announced in 1984. The conjecture, posed by Ludwig Bieberbach in 1916, concerns a normalized univalent function

$$f(z)=z+a_2z^2+a_3z^3+\cdots$$

on the unit disk and asserts that

$$|a_n|\le n$$

for every n. De Branges proved the stronger Milin conjecture, from which the Bieberbach conjecture follows. His method drew on operator theory and special functions and was regarded as coming from unexpected directions relative to earlier attempts on the problem.

The proof was initially met with skepticism, in part because de Branges had previously announced results that were later found to be incorrect. It underwent detailed verification by mathematicians at the Steklov Institute of Mathematics in Leningrad before being accepted, and later treatments simplified parts of the argument.

De Branges gave a plenary address on the proof at the 1986 International Congress of Mathematicians in Berkeley. His work on the Bieberbach conjecture was subsequently recognized by the inaugural Ostrowski Prize and by the 1994 Leroy P. Steele Prize for Seminal Contribution to Research.

=== Work related to the Riemann hypothesis ===
De Branges also pursued applications of Hilbert spaces of entire functions to the Riemann hypothesis and related questions concerning Dirichlet L-functions. In a 1994 paper in the Journal of Functional Analysis, he formulated a conjecture concerning a matrix analogue of the Euler product and showed that it would imply the Riemann hypothesis for Dirichlet zeta functions.

J. Brian Conrey and Xian-Jin Li later examined positivity conditions arising in de Branges's approach. They found that some of the conditions required by the proposed method are not satisfied by the relevant zeta and L-functions, illustrating difficulties in carrying the program through to a proof. De Branges subsequently circulated further manuscripts claiming proofs or extensions of the Riemann hypothesis; these claims have not been accepted.

== Controversial claims of solutions to unsolved problems ==
In June 2004, de Branges announced he had a proof of the Riemann hypothesis, often called the greatest unsolved problem in mathematics, and published the 124-page proof on his website.

That original preprint suffered a number of revisions until it was replaced in December 2007 by a much more ambitious claim, which he had been developing for one year in the form of a parallel manuscript. He later released evolving versions of two claimed generalizations, following independent but complementary approaches, of his original argument. In the shortest of them (43 pages as of 2009), which he titles "Apology for the Proof of the Riemann Hypothesis" (using the word "apology" in the rarely used sense of apologia), he claims to use his tools from the theory of Hilbert spaces of entire functions to prove the Riemann hypothesis for Dirichlet L-functions (thus proving the generalized Riemann hypothesis) and a similar statement for the Euler zeta function, and even to be able to assert that zeros are simple. In the other one (57 pages), he claims to modify his earlier approach on the subject by means of spectral theory and harmonic analysis to obtain a proof of the Riemann hypothesis for Hecke L-functions, a group even more general than Dirichlet L-functions (which would imply an even more powerful result if his claim was shown to be correct). As of January 2016, his paper entitled "A proof of the Riemann Hypothesis" is 74 pages long, but does not conclude with a proof. A commentary on his attempt is available on the Internet.

Mathematicians remain skeptical, and neither proof has been subjected to a serious analysis. The main objection to his approach comes from a 1998 paper (published two years later) by Brian Conrey and Xian-Jin Li, one of de Branges' former Ph.D. students and discoverer of Li's criterion, a notable equivalent statement of the Riemann hypothesis. Peter Sarnak also gave contributions to the central argument. The paper – which, contrarily to de Branges' claimed proof, was peer-reviewed and published in a scientific journal – gives numerical counterexamples and non-numerical counterclaims to some positivity conditions concerning Hilbert spaces which would, according to previous demonstrations by de Branges, imply the correctness of the Riemann hypothesis. Specifically, the authors proved that the positivity required of an analytic function F(z) which de Branges would use to construct his proof would also force it to assume certain inequalities that, according to them, the functions actually relevant to a proof do not satisfy. As their paper predates the current claimed proof by five years, and refers to work published in peer-reviewed journals by de Branges between 1986 and 1994, it remains to be seen whether de Branges has managed to circumvent their objections. He does not cite their paper in his preprints, but both of them cite a 1986 paper of his that was attacked by Li and Conrey. Journalist Karl Sabbagh, who in 2003 had written a book on the Riemann Hypothesis centered on de Branges, quoted Conrey as saying in 2005 that he still believed de Branges' approach was inadequate to tackling the conjecture, even though he acknowledged that it is a beautiful theory in many other ways. He gave no indication he had actually read the then current version of the purported proof (see reference 1). In a 2003 technical comment, Conrey said that he did not believe that the Riemann hypothesis was going to yield to functional analysis tools. De Branges, incidentally, also claims that his new proof represents a simplification of the arguments present in the removed paper on the classical Riemann hypothesis, and insists that number theorists will have no trouble checking it. Li and Conrey do not assert that de Branges' mathematics are wrong, only that the conclusions he drew from them in his original papers are, and that his tools are therefore inadequate to address the problems in question.

Li released a claimed proof of the Riemann hypothesis in the arXiv in July 2008, but it was retracted a few days later, after several mainstream mathematicians exposed a crucial flaw, in a display of interest that his former advisor's claimed proofs have apparently not enjoyed so far.

Meanwhile, the "apology" has become a diary of sorts, in which he also discusses the historical context of the Riemann hypothesis, and how his personal story is intertwined with the proofs. He signs his papers and preprints as "Louis de Branges", and is always cited this way. However, he does seem interested in his de Bourcia ancestors, and discusses the origins of both families in the Apology.

The particular analysis tools he has developed, although largely successful in tackling the Bieberbach conjecture, have been mastered by only a handful of other mathematicians (many of whom have studied under de Branges). This poses another difficulty to verification of his current work, which is largely self-contained: most research papers de Branges chose to cite in his claimed proof of the Riemann hypothesis were written by himself over a period of forty years. During most of his working life he published articles as the sole author.

The Riemann hypothesis is one of the deepest problems in all of mathematics. It is one of the six unsolved Millennium Prize Problems. A simple search in the arXiv yields several claims of proofs, some of them by mathematicians working at academic institutions, that remain unverified and are usually dismissed by mainstream scholars. A few of those have even cited de Branges' preprints in their references, which means that his work has not gone completely unnoticed. This shows that de Branges' apparent estrangement is not an isolated case, but he is probably the most renowned professional to have a current unverified claim.

He released another preprint on his Web site that claims to solve a measure problem due to Stefan Banach.

== Awards and honors ==
In 1989, he was the first recipient of the Ostrowski Prize and in 1994 he was awarded the Leroy P. Steele Prize for Seminal Contribution to Research.

In 2012, he became a fellow of the American Mathematical Society.

== See also ==
- Scattering theory – used by de Branges in his early approach to the Riemann hypothesis.
- Peter Lax
