= Univalent function =

Mathematical concept

In mathematics, in the branch of complex analysis, a holomorphic function on an open subset of the complex plane is called univalent if it is injective.

== Examples ==
The function $f \colon z \mapsto 2z + z^2$ is univalent in the open unit disc, as $f(z) = f(w)$ implies that $f(z) - f(w) = (z-w)(z+w+2) = 0$. As the second factor is non-zero in the open unit disc, $z = w$ so $f$ is injective.

== Basic properties ==
One can prove that if $G$ and $\Omega$ are two open connected sets in the complex plane, and

$$f: G \to \Omega$$

is a univalent function such that $f(G) = \Omega$ (that is, $f$ is surjective), then the derivative of $f$ is never zero, $f$ is invertible, and its inverse $f^{-1}$ is also holomorphic. More, one has by the chain rule

$$(f^{-1})'(f(z)) = \frac{1}{f'(z)}$$

for all $z$ in $G.$

== Comparison with real functions ==
For real analytic functions, unlike for complex analytic (that is, holomorphic) functions, these statements fail to hold. For example, consider the function

$$f: (-1, 1) \to (-1, 1) \,$$

given by $f(x)=x^3$. This function is clearly injective, but its derivative is 0 at $x=0$, and its inverse is not analytic, or even differentiable, on the whole interval $(-1,1)$. Consequently, if we enlarge the domain to an open subset $G$ of the complex plane, it must fail to be injective; and this is the case, since (for example) $f(\varepsilon \omega) = f(\varepsilon)$ (where $\omega$ is a primitive cube root of unity and $\varepsilon$ is a positive real number smaller than the radius of $G$ as a neighbourhood of $0$).

== See also ==
- Biholomorphic mapping – Bijective holomorphic function with a holomorphic inverse
- De Branges's theorem – Statement in complex analysis; formerly the Bieberbach conjecture
- Koebe quarter theorem – Statement in complex analysis
- Riemann mapping theorem – Mathematical theorem
- Nevanlinna's criterion – Characterization of starlike univalent holomorphic functions
