= List of mathematicians who did research in prison =

A number of people have done mathematical research while imprisoned. Some were put in prisoner-of-war camps during various conflicts, including World War I and World War II; others were forced into labour or concentration camps. Several mathematicians were jailed as a result of their political views (at least in part), notably Évariste Galois, Bertrand Russell, and Chandler Davis.

Name	Prison	Time period	Notable work done in prison	Notes
Jean-Victor Poncelet	Saratov prisoner of war camp	1813–1814	Formulation of projective properties of conics (Note: Later published in Traité des propriétés projectives des figures.)	Captured during the French invasion of Russia.
Évariste Galois	Sainte Pélagie Prison	1831–1832	Preface to Deux mémoires d’analyse pur	Arrested during Bastille Day demonstrations; charged with wearing a police uniform and carrying a firearm. (Note: Previously arrested for alleged threats against King Louis Philippe I.)
André Bloch	Charenton mental asylum	1917–1948	Various pieces of complex analysis, including Bloch's theorem and Bloch's principle	Committed after murdering several family members; all of his publications were written while in Charenton.
Bertrand Russell	HM Prison Brixton	1918	Introduction to Mathematical Philosophy	Imprisoned due to anti-war activities during World War I.
Ludwig Wittgenstein	Prisoner of war camps in Como and Cassino	1918–1919	Tractatus Logico-Philosophicus	Captured by Italian forces while serving in the Austrian Army.
André Weil	Rouen Prison	1940	Proof of the Riemann hypothesis for curves over finite fields	Jailed for avoiding military obligations; also worked on his draft of a Bourbaki volume on integration in prison.
Pál Turán	Various labour camps in Hungary	1940–1944	Turán's brick factory problem (Note: Formulated while working in a brick factory near Budapest in 1944.)	Interned in forced labour service as a Hungarian Jew during World War II; also published work relating to the Riemann zeta function.
Jean Leray	Oflag XVII-A	1940–1945	Work in algebraic topology, including sheaves and spectral sequences	Became a German prisoner of war; avoided research in fluid mechanics due to fear the Germans would require him to work for them.
Jakow Trachtenberg	Sachsenhausen or Auschwitz concentration camp	194?–1945	Trachtenberg system of mental arithmetic	Taken by the Gestapo after fleeing to Yugoslavia.
Chandler Davis	Danbury Federal Correctional Institution	1960		Imprisoned for refusal to testify before the House Un-American Activities Committee. (Note: A footnote to a paper he partially wrote in prison reads Research supported in part by the Federal Prison System. Opinions expressed in this paper are the author’s and are not necessarily those of the Bureau of Prisons.)
Christopher Havens	Currently Monroe Correctional Complex	2011–		Sentenced to 25 years for murder; cofounded the Prison Mathematics Project in 2020. (Note: As of 2026, he has published 6 papers and written a textbook chapter on continued fractions.)
