= Inès de La Fressange =

French fashion designer and model (born 1957)

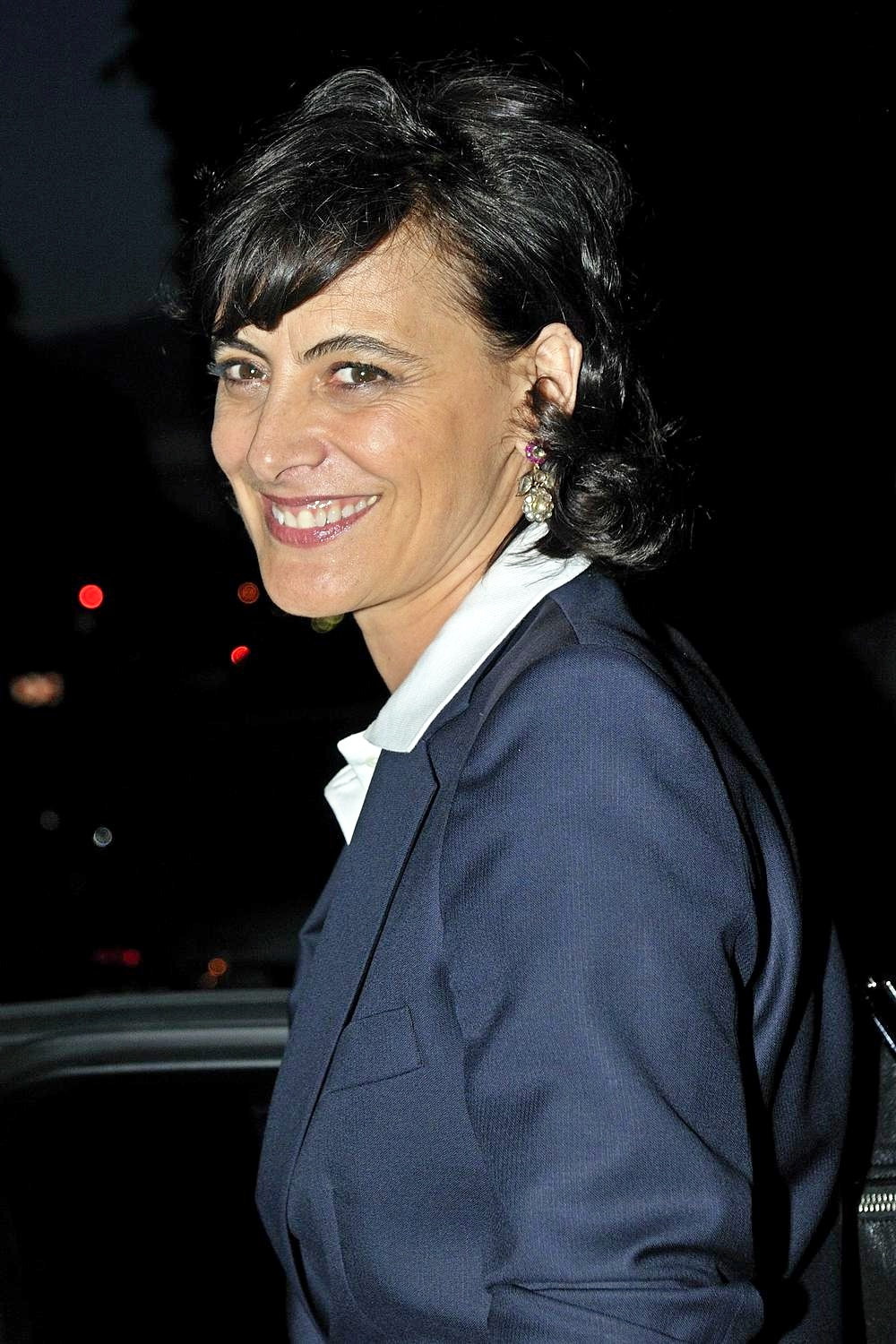
- Inès de La Fressange, 2009
- Born: 11 August 1957 (age 69); Gassin, Var, France
- Spouse: Luigi d'Urso (m. 1990; died 2006)
- Children: 2
- Modeling information
- Height: 180 cm (5 ft 11 in)
- Hair color: Brown
- Eye color: Brown
- Agency: VIVA Model Management (Paris, London, Barcelona)

Inès Marie Lætitia Églantine Isabelle de Seignard de La Fressange (French pronunciation: [inɛs maʁi letisja eɡlɑ̃tin izabɛl də sɛɲaʁ də la fʁɛsɑ̃ʒ]; born 11 August 1957) is a French supermodel, fashion designer and perfumer. She was named to the International Best Dressed List Hall of Fame in 1998.

== Biography ==
=== Family and childhood ===
Coat of arms of the Saignard de la Fressange family

La Fressange was born in Gassin, Var, the daughter of André Jean Bernard de Seignard, Marquis de La Fressange (b. 1932), a French stockbroker, and his wife, the former Cecilia Lita Sánchez-Davila (b. 1935), an Argentine-Colombian model closely related to two former presidents of Colombia, Alfonso Lopez Pumarejo and Alfonso Lopez Michelsen.

Her family on her father's side comes from an old French nobility (1439), and had the seigneury of Fressange in the Velay (in Auvergne). Her uncle, Hubert de La Fressange (b. 1923), died in the Second World War on 2 October 1944 in Anglemont, during which he participated in its liberation. Her grandmother, the Marquise Simone de La Fressange, née Lazard was heiress to the Lazard banking fortune (Banque Lazard). She married two ministers in succession, Maurice Petsche, and then Louis Jacquinot.

Ines grew up in an 18th-century mill outside Paris with two brothers, Emmanuel, the eldest, and her younger brother, Ivan. She studied at the Tournelle Institution in Courgent, then at the Notre-Dame de Mantes-la-Jolie Institution in the Yvelines where she got her baccalaureate at the age of 16, and then went to the École du Louvre in Paris.

=== Career ===
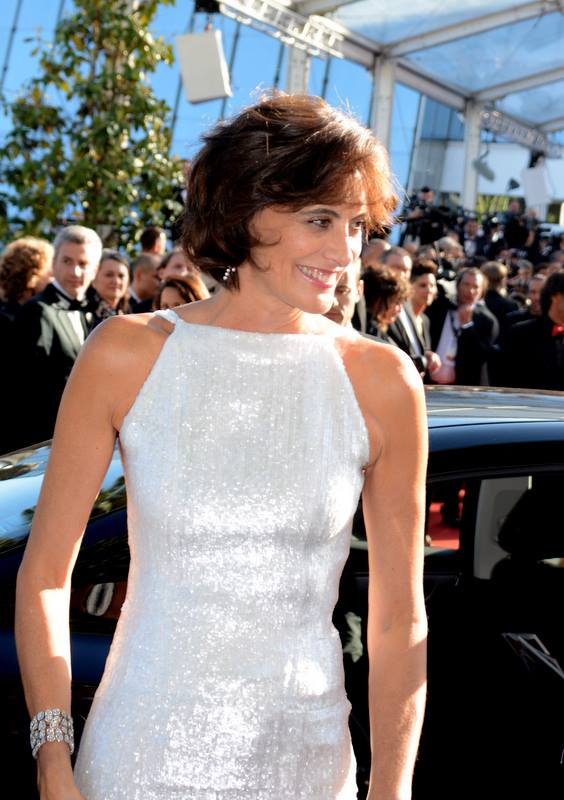
Ines at the 2014 Cannes Film Festival

Tall at 180 cm (5 ft 11 in) and with a weight of 50 kg (110 lb), she began her career as a model in 1974 at the age of 17. She quickly became nicknamed by many as "the talking mannequin", due to her tendency to talk with fashion journalists and express her opinions on her profession and on fashion.

In 1975, at the age of 18, La Fressange appeared for the first time in photos by Oliviero Toscani for Elle magazine, then modelled for Thierry Mugler and other designers.

In 1983 she became the first model to sign an exclusive modeling contract with the haute couture fashion house, Chanel, by fashion designer Karl Lagerfeld, whose muse she became due to her remarkable resemblance to the brand's founder, Coco Chanel, who died in 1971.

In 1989, she appeared in 'Postcard from Paris' with Clive James where she was interviewed at the Cafe Costes. In his memoir, James later recalled that she seemed to be "made of light".

However, in 1989, Lagerfeld and La Fressange had an argument and parted company. Likely this argument was, at least in part, regarding her decision to lend her likeness to a bust of Marianne, the ubiquitous symbol of the French Republic. Lagerfeld reputedly condemned her decision, saying that Marianne was the embodiment of "everything that is boring, bourgeois, and provincial" and that he would not dress up historic monuments.

In 1991, with the financial support of the luxury brand, Orcofi, she created her own brand 'Inès de la Fressange' and opened her own Boutique, selling various products such as perfumes originating from the area in which her grandfather lived, at 12 Avenue Montaigne in the 8th arrondissement of Paris. It was an immediate success not only in France, but also in the US and in Japan.

In December 1999, due to equity dilution, she was made redundant from her own company in which she was not a majority shareholder, her majority co-shareholders insisting it was because she had designed a pill-dispenser for the 'Elixir of Abbé Soury'. She lost the rights to use her name and personal brand; she was victorious in an ensuing legal action and, in 2016, launched her eponymous line of clothing. Since 2013, La Fressange has also been designing for the Japanese brand Uniqlo.

In 2008, she walked the runway for Gaultier at age 51. She also modeled at the Chanel spring-summer 2011 show.

In 2011, La Fressange and fashion journalist Sophie Gachet co-wrote Parisian Chic, a Style Guide. In 2019, the two published Parisian Chic Encore: A Style Guide.

=== Personal life ===
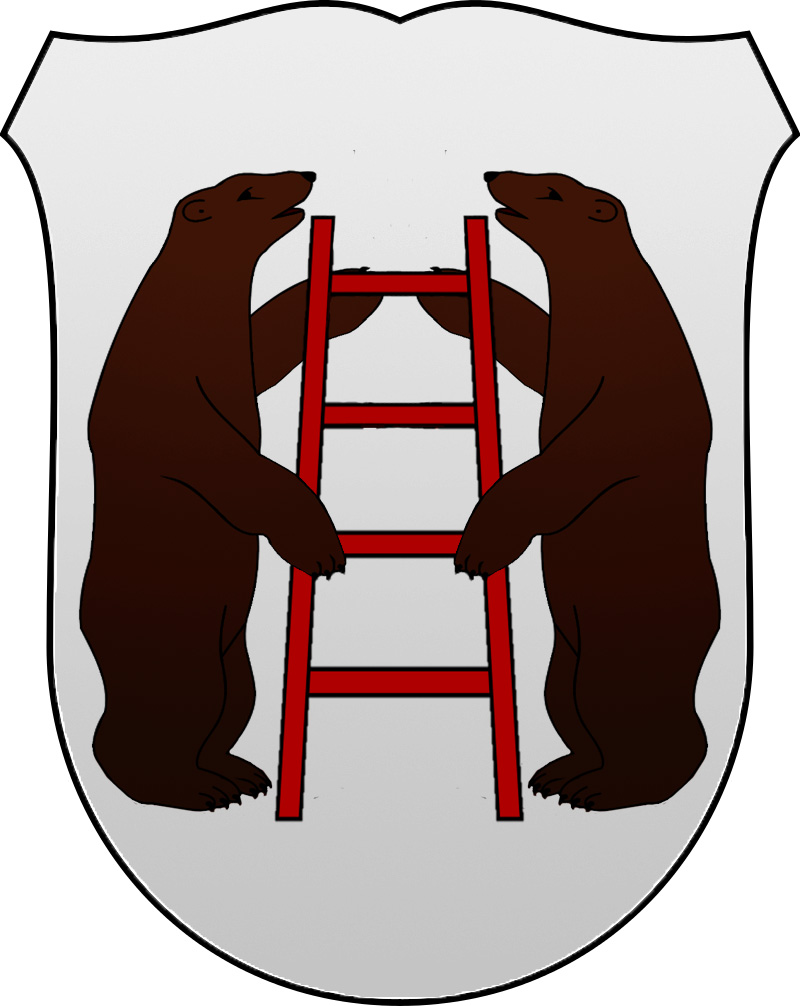
Arms of d'Urso family

On 9 June 1990, in Tarascon, France, she married Luigi d'Urso (1951–2006), an Italian nobleman and a railroad executive. Luigi was the son of Alessandro d'Urso (1913–2000), and his wife, Donna Clotilde Serra dei Duchi di Cassano (1917–1960), daughter of Don Luigi Serra, 9th Duke di Cassano (1868–1935), and Elizabeth Grant (1886–1938); descendant of George Clymer, one of the Founding Fathers of the United States, who signed both the United States Declaration of Independence in 1776 and the United States Constitution in 1787). Luigi and Inès had two daughters, Nine Marie d'Urso (born 27 February 1994) and Violette Marie d'Urso (born 6 August 1999). She has two stepdaughters, Clotilde d'Urso and India d'Urso, the daughters of Luigi d'Urso by his first wife, Guendalina Levier-Ffoulke. Luigi d'Urso died of a heart attack in 2006, at age 52. Since 2009, La Fressange has been in a relationship with the French entrepreneur and journalist Denis Olivennes (b. 1960), the son of psychiatrist and poet Armand Olivennes (1931–2006), nephew of Claude Olievenstein, also a psychiatrist, and younger brother of François Olivennes, a French obstetrician and gynaecologist.

== Ancestry ==
Ancestors of Inès de La Fressange

16. Alfred Charles Henri François de Seignard, Marquis de La Fressange
8. Alexandre Auguste Etienne Henri de Seignard, Marquis de La Fressange
17. Henriette Frère de la Falconière
4. Paul Marie Alfed Henri de Seignard, Marquis de La Fressange
18. Gabriel Henri, Count de Bonneval
9. Vincentine Marie Constance Sibylle de Bonneval
19. Marie Louise Antoinette de Gerliez
2. André de Seignard, Marquis de La Fressange
20. Simon Lazard
10. André Lazard
21. Rose Hélène Foy
5. Simone Lazard
22. Ferdinand Goldschmidt
11. Lucie Goldschmidt
23. Julie Rachel Hermann
1. Inès de La Fressange
12. Nazario Sánchez-Cirez
6. Alberto Sánchez-Cirez
13. Eulogia Cires-Roca
3. Cecilia Sánchez-Davila
28. Manuel Dávila García
14. General Juan Manuel Dávila Pumarejo
29. Rosa Pumarejo Quirós
7. Cecilia Dávila Ordóñez
30. Francisco Ordóñez Rodríguez
15. Josefina Ordóñez Reyes
31. Isabel Reyes Gutiérrez
