= Henri Béghin =

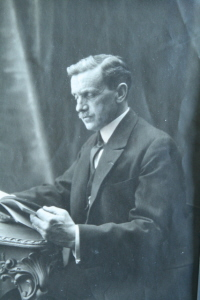

Henri Béghin (16 September 1876 – 22 February 1969) was a French professor of mathematical and applied mechanics.

Béghin was born in Lille where his father was an engineer trained at the École Polytechnique who was involved in founding the Northern Railway Company. Béghin went to the École normale supérieure (1894-1897), where his contemporaries included Paul Montel, Henri Lebesgue, Paul Langevin, and Charles Péguy. He became a chair of applied mechanics at the University of Lille in 1924. He trained students of the Naval Academy from 1899 to 1921. His work included studies to develop a high precision gyro-compass and a gyro-stabilized sextant for use with ship-mounted guns. He became a professor at Paris and 1929. His textbook on exercises in mechanics published in 1930 was very influential.
