= Rebecca Waldecker =

German mathematician

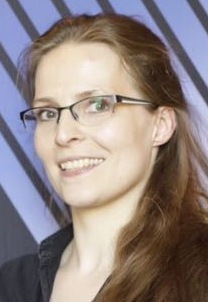
Rebecca Waldecker, 2017

Rebecca Anne Hedwig Waldecker (born 1979) is a German mathematician specializing in group theory. She is professor for algebra at Martin Luther University of Halle-Wittenberg.

== Education and career ==
Waldecker is originally from Aachen. She earned her doctorate (Dr. rer. nat.) at the University of Kiel in 2007, under the supervision of Helmut Bender, and in 2014 completed her habilitation at Martin Luther University of Halle-Wittenberg.

After postdoctoral research as a Leverhulme Fellow at the University of Birmingham, Waldecker joined Martin Luther University of Halle-Wittenberg as a junior professor in 2009. She became professor for algebra in 2015.

== Books ==
Waldecker is the author of the book Isolated Involutions in Finite Groups (Memoirs of the American Mathematical Society, 2013), developed from her doctoral dissertation.

With Lasse Rempe-Gillen, she is the coauthor of Primzahltests für Einsteiger: Zahlentheorie, Algorithmik, Kryptographie (Vieweg+Teubner, 2009; 2nd ed., Springer, 2016), a book on primality tests that was translated into English as Primality Testing for Beginners (Student Mathematical Library 70, American Mathematical Society, 2014).

She became a coauthor to the 2012 textbook Elementare Algebra und Zahlentheorie of Gernot Stroth, in its second edition (Mathematik Kompakt, Springer, 2019).
