= Wiman–Valiron theory =

Mathematical theory

Wiman–Valiron theory is a mathematical theory invented by Anders Wiman as a tool to study the behavior of arbitrary entire functions. After the work of Wiman, the theory was developed by other mathematicians, and extended to more general classes of analytic functions. The main result of the theory is an asymptotic formula for the function and its derivatives near the point where the maximum modulus of this function is attained.

== Maximal term and central index ==
By definition, an entire function can be represented by a power series which is convergent for all complex $z$:

$$f(z)=\sum_{n=0}^\infty a_nz^n.$$

The terms of this series tend to 0 as $n\to\infty$, so for each $z$ there is a term of maximal modulus. This term depends on $r := \vert z \vert$. Its modulus is called the maximal term of the series:

$$\mu(r,f)=\max_k |a_k|r^k=:|a_n|r^n,\quad r\geq 0.$$

Here $n$ is the exponent for which the maximum is attained; if there are several maximal terms, we define $n$ as the largest exponent of them. This number $n$ depends on $r$, it is denoted by $n(r,f)$ and is called the central index.

Let

$$M(r,f)=\max\{ |f(z)|: |z|\leq r \}$$

be the maximum modulus of the function $f$. Cauchy's inequality implies that $\mu(r,f)\leq M(r,f)$ for all $r\geq 0$. The converse estimate $M(r,f)\leq (\mu(r,f))^{1+\epsilon}$ was first proved by Borel, and a more precise estimate due to Wiman reads

$$M(r,f)\leq \mu(r,f)\left(\log\mu(r,f)\right)^{1/2+\epsilon},$$

in the sense that for every $\epsilon>0$ there exist arbitrarily large values of $r$ for which this inequality holds. In fact, it was shown by Valiron that the above relation holds for "most" values of $r$: the exceptional set $E$ for which it does not hold has finite logarithmic measure:

$$\int_E\frac{dr}{r}<\infty.$$

Improvements of these inequality were subject of much research in the 20th century.

== Main asymptotic formula ==
The following result of Wiman is fundamental for various applications: let $z_r$ be the point for which the maximum in the definition of $M(r,f)$ is attained; by the Maximum Principle we have $\vert z_r \vert = r$. It turns out that $f(z)$ behaves near the point $z_r$ like a monomial: there are arbitrarily large values of $r$ such that the formula

$$f(z)=(1+o(1))\left(\frac{z}{z_r}\right)^{n(r,f)}f(z_r),$$

holds in the disk

$$|z-z_r|<\frac{r}{\left(n(r)\right)^{1/2+\epsilon}}.$$

Here $\epsilon>0$ is an arbitrary positive number, and the o(1) refers to $r\to\infty,\; r\not\in E$, where $E$ is the exceptional set described above. This disk is usually called the Wiman–Valiron disk.

== Applications ==
The formula for $f(z)$ for $z$ near $z_r$ can be differentiated so we have an asymptotic relation

$$f^{(m)}(z)=(1+o(1))\left(\frac{n(r)}{z}\right)^m\left(\frac{r}{z_r}\right)^{n(r)}f(z_r).$$

This is useful for studies of entire solutions of differential equations.

Another important application is due to Valiron who noticed that the image of the Wiman–Valiron disk contains a "large" annulus ($\{ z:r_1 < \vert z \vert < r_2\}$ where both $r_1$ and $r_2/r_1$ are arbitrarily large). This implies the important theorem of Valiron that there are arbitrarily large discs in the plane in which the inverse branches of an entire function can be defined. A quantitative version of this statement is known as the Bloch theorem.

This theorem of Valiron has further applications in holomorphic dynamics: it is used in the proof of the fact that the escaping set of an entire function is not empty.

== Later development ==
In 1938, Macintyre found that one can get rid of the central index and of power series itself in this theory. Macintyre replaced the central index by the quantity

$$a(r,f):=r\frac{M'(r,f)}{M(r,f)}$$

and proved the main relation in the form

$$f^{(m)}(z)=(1+o(1))\left(\frac{a(r,f)}{z}\right)^m\left(\frac{z}{z_r}\right)^{a(r,f)}f(z_r)\quad\mbox{for}
\quad|z-z_r|\leq\frac{r}{(a(r,f))^{1/2+\epsilon}}.$$

This statement does not mention the power series, but the assumption that $f$ is entire was used by Macintyre.

The final generalization was achieved by Bergweiler, Rippon and Stallard who showed that this relation persists for every unbounded analytic function $f$ defined in an arbitrary unbounded region $D$ in the complex plane, under the only assumption that $|f(z)|$ is bounded for $z\in\partial D$. The key statement which makes this generalization possible is that the Wiman–Valiron disk is actually contained in $D$ for all non-exceptional $r$.
