= Claude Olievenstein =

French psychiatrist (1933–2008)

Claude Olievenstein (11 June 1933 -- 14 December 2008) was a pioneering French psychiatrist who specialised in the treatment of substance dependence. In 1971 he founded the Marmottan Medical Centre in Paris as a "centre for care and support for addictive practices". Because of this, and because he published extensively, he became well known, attracting the media soubriquet "le psy des toxicos" (loosely, "shrink to the addicts").

== Life ==
=== Provenance and early years ===
Claude Olievenstein was born in Berlin five months after Adolf Hitler took power. According to several sources his parents worked in tailoring. Elsewhere Maurice Olievensztein, his father, is described as a company sales director ("Directeur commercial de société"). He himself rarely mentioned of his Jewish early childhood in Berlin. He did write of one important experience, however. One evening Claude and his elder brother Armand accompanied their grandfather to the circus. A Nazi thug whom they encountered presumably realised that they were Jewish and hit the old man, pushing him to the ground: "I saw him sprawling on his hands and feet, and even today I feel an unbelievable surge in hatred [at the thought if it]. My grandfather, who was a proud man, stood up without saying a word, dusted off his hat, and took our hands ... the humiliation was experienced [by him] as a complete global collapse. He had the reaction which, twenty years later, would be mine." (Note: "Je le revois à quatre pattes, et, aujourd'hui encore, je ressens en moi une incroyable montée de haine. Mon grand-père, qui était un homme fier, s'est relevé sans mot dire, a épousseté son chapeau et nous a repris par la main (...). Pour cet homme qui était très sincère, l'humiliation a été vécue comme un écroulement total, global. Et il a eu la réaction qui, vingt ans plus tard, serait la mienne : il a revendiqué sa solidarité avec son peuple.")

=== Armand ===
Claude Olievenstein's elder brother, Armand Olivennes (1931-2006) also became a psychiatrist. But he is better remembered as a prolific poet. After they moved to France. Armand married and changed his family name to one that sounded more French. Claude Olievenstein did not do this.

Because Armand's marriage to Marie Landau was fruitful, Claude Olievenstein also became uncle to the left-wing businessman and controversialist Denis Olivennes.

=== Student years ===
Although the shoah unfolded in all its horror only during the early 1940s, long before that it was already clear that the situation in Germany was only going to get worse, especially for Jews. Towards the end of the 1930s the Olievensteins escaped to France. By 1942 the French puppet government was beginning to round up Jews in the southern half of France, where most had congregated to get away from occupied northern France (Approximately 50% of the Jews in Metropolitan France were by this time refugees from Germany or from territories recently over-run by German forces.) For those gathered up, deportation to death camps in Germany followed. The Olievensteins, however, having avoided extermination by escaping from Germany to France, now avoided extermination a second time when they refused to comply with the government requirement that Jews should identify themselves by always wearing a Yellow star where it could be seen. Following a childhood which taught him to conceal his Jewish provenance, after the nightmare ended Claude Olievenstein's family settled in Paris, city which he would quickly come to love: "Now we had our place in the world. We had the right to be ourselves, the 'Jewish problem' had ceased to exist". It was in Paris that Claude Olievenstein undertook his studies in Psychiatry. As a young man be briefly joined the Young Communists, but was in the end excluded. He became one of the leaders of the Union of French Jewish students: his Jewish identity was always very important to him.

Part of Olievenstein's training was undertaken at the Charenton asylum near the Bois de Vincennes park, where he studied under the internationally renowned neuropsychiatrist Dr. Henri Baruk (1897-1999). Many of Baruk's ideas were at the time outside the medical mainstream: he was passionately opposed to the use of antipsychotic drugs, and indeed forbade their use in the cases under his charge. That was followed by a couple of internships. In 1965, as an internee at the hospital in Villejuif, he rebelled against the system of institutionalised asylums which, he said, simply created dependency in patients and did nothing to cure them. Olievenstein was far from alone in voicing these concerns, which were also being raised by the charismatic philosopher turned psychologist Michel Foucault. In 1967 Olievenstein visited California and was evidently influenced by the "Summer of Love" ideas then circulating on the American west coast. The next year, when the time came to defend his doctoral thesis, his chosen subject was LSD. His researches involved becoming sensitised to the issues surrounding drug addiction. They may also have involved experimenting with he fashionable (but illegal) recreational drugs of the time, but sources are evasive on the point. After that he began to find himself sought out as a possible source of confidential advice, first by drug users and, later, by relevant public authorities.

=== Physician ===
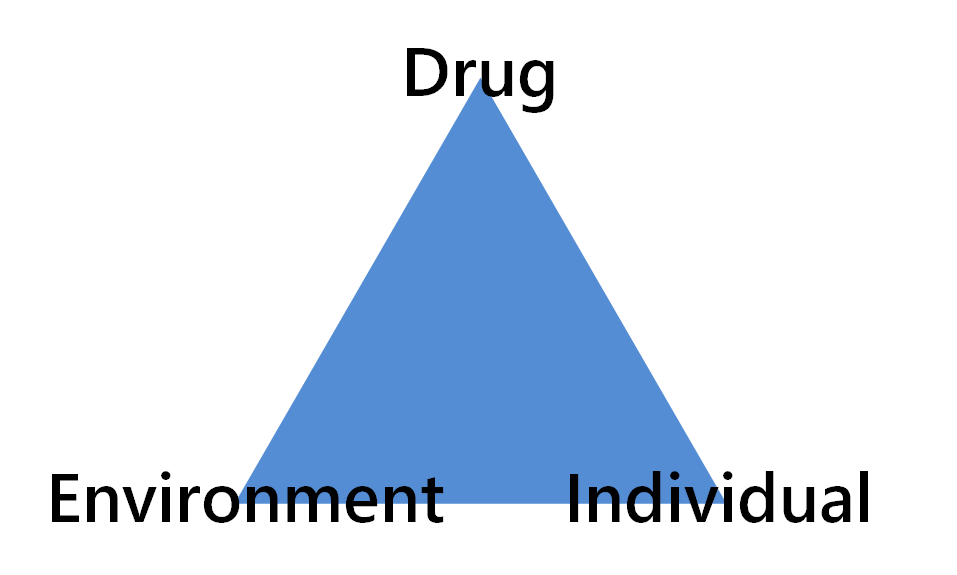
To understand addiction, Olievenstein proposed the triangle: drug/individual/environment. These three key factors influence drug use: the drug (type, strength, availability, etc.), the individual (age, genetics, personality, etc.) and the environment (relatives, poverty, social norms, drug policy, etc.).

With drug dependency rising up the public agenda during the 1960s and 1970s, Olievenstein's subject choice for his dissertation was timely. He was one of the first French psychiatrists to focus on the treatment of drugs dependency. In pursuit of this, in 1971, he founded the Marmottan Medical Centre in Paris as a "centre for care and support for [non-alcoholic] addictive practices". (Alcoholism was a long-standing issue that was already more extensively catered for by the medial establishment.) Marmottan became an international benchmark facility, training a number of specialists who subsequently themselves became leaders in the field of addiction treatment He advocated a form of care that saw admission to the institution not as the solution to addiction problems, but as the opportunity to start a psychotherapeutic treatment programm inspired by psychoanalysis, which at that time was still a widely respected therapeutic device. Opposition to Marmottan came not just from local residents. There were still many in the mainstream medical community who believed that enforced very rapid weaning off addictive drugs was the only effective treatment.

During the 1970s, Olievenstein wrote up and published his researches and findings. One book which found a wider audience was published in 1977 under the title "Il n'y a pas de drogués heureux" ("There are no happy drug addicts"). The opening line was almost as arresting as the title: "I could have been a little Nazi if I hadn't also been a little Jew". (Note: "J'aurais pu être un petit nazi si je n'avais été, aussi, un petit juif.") The book became a best seller.

Before the scourge of HIV/AIDS was identified, Olievenstein vigorously opposed methadone treatments and the perceived dogmatism of one or two "therapy lobbies". Instead he teamed up with Joseph Engelmajer to set up in the south (near Toulouse) Le Patriarche, an association committed to "rehabilitating drug users in a communitarian environment". The approach became popular nable during the 1970s and 1980s, but as fashions in medicine moved on Le Patriarche fell from favour, identified in a 1995 government report as one of several "sects" that had emerged to support drug addicts. He also opposed the unregulated sale of syringes (although he was quick to change his position once the role of shared syringes in connection with the AIDS epidemic emerged). Claude Olievenstein believed there was a sense in which "therapeutic communities" under the direction of non-professionals were simply an alternative form of alienation. He shifted his position in 1984, responding to the AIDS crisis, becoming an advocate for the (still tightly regulated) decriminalisation of Cannabis use. But he continued to speak out against the alleged benefits of Methadone treatment. He was also critical of Methadone substitutes, notably "Subutex" (Buprénorphine) on account of addictive properties that could very readily make it a "treatment for a lifetime".

In 1987, Claude Olievenstein accepted an appointment as associate professor of anthropology at the University of Lyon. Here he conducted a seminar course on the excluded and marginalised.

His 1999 book "Naissance de la Veillillesse" ("Birth of Old Age") concerns his Parkinson's diagnosis. The condition progressed relatively rapidly, obliging Claude Olievenstein to retire in June 2001. Faced with a rapid physical decline, he soon disappeared from public life. Claude Olievenstein died in Paris on Sunday 14 December 2008.

== Output (selection) ==
- La Drogue - Éditions Universitaires - 1970
- La Drogue : drogues et toxicomanie - Éditions Universitaires, 1973
- Écrits sur la Toxicomanie - Éditions Universitaires, 1973
- Il n'y a pas de drogués heureux - Éditions Robert Laffont, 1977 ISBN 978-2221001875 et Opera Mundi
- La Drogue (suivi de) Écrits sur la toxicomanie - Paris - Éditions Universitaires - 1978
- Mes tables de fête : 91 restaurants parisiens - Paris - Ramsay, 1979
- La Vie du toxicomane : Séminaire de l'Hôpital Marmottan - Paris - PUF, 1982
- Destin du toxicomane - Paris - Librairie Arthème Fayard, 1983
- La Drogue et la Vie - Éditions Robert Laffont, 1983 ISBN 978-2221011706
- La Clinique du toxicomane (sous la direction de) - Éditions universitaires Begedis - Paris, 1987
- Le Non-dit des émotions - Éditions Odile Jacob, 1988 ISBN 978-2738108807
- L'Homme parano - Éditions Odile Jacob, 1992 ISBN 2-7381-0157-7
- De la neige plein les veines - Paris - Éditions Saint-Germain-Des-Pré, 1994
- Écrit sur la bouche - Paris - Éditions Odile Jacob, 1995 ISBN 978-2738102690
- Naissance de la vieillesse - Éditions Odile Jacob, 1999 ISBN 2738107958
- Partager l'essentiel Saint-Jean-de-Braye - Éditions Dangles, 1999
- La Drogue, 30 ans après - Éditions Odile Jacob, 2000 ISBN 273810892X
- Toxicomanie et devenir de l'humanité : le Centre médical Marmottan : une expérience française, Éditions Odile Jacob, 2001 ISBN 2-7381-1019-3
- Comme un ange cannibale - with Carlos Parada, Éditions Odile Jacob, 2002 ISBN 978-2738111456
