= Montel's theorem =

Two theorems about families of holomorphic functions

In complex analysis, an area of mathematics, Montel's theorem refers to one of two theorems about families of holomorphic functions. These are named after French mathematician Paul Montel, and give conditions under which a family of holomorphic functions is normal.

== Locally uniformly bounded families are normal ==
The first, and simpler, version of the theorem states that a family of holomorphic functions defined on an open subset of the complex numbers is normal if and only if it is locally uniformly bounded.

=== Definition of local uniform boundedness ===
A family of holomorphic functions $\mathcal{F}$ with domain $\Omega$ is called locally uniformly bounded if, for every compact subset $K \subset \Omega$, the restriction $\mathcal{F}|_K$ is uniformly bounded.

=== Corollary ===
This theorem has the following formally stronger corollary. Suppose that $\mathcal{F}$ is a family of meromorphic functions on an open set $D$. If $z_0\in D$ is such that $\mathcal{F}$ is not normal at $z_0$, and $U\subset D$ is a neighborhood of $z_0$, then $\bigcup_{f\in\mathcal{F}}f(U)$ is dense in the complex plane.

== Functions omitting two values ==
The stronger version of Montel's theorem (occasionally referred to as the Fundamental Normality Test) states that a family of holomorphic functions, all of which omit the same two values $a,b\in\mathbb{C},$ is normal.

== Necessity ==
The conditions in the above theorems are sufficient, but not necessary for normality. Indeed, the family $\{z\mapsto z\}$ is normal, but does not omit any complex value.

== Proofs ==
The first version of Montel's theorem is a direct consequence of Marty's theorem (which states that a family is normal if and only if the spherical derivatives are locally bounded) and Cauchy's integral formula.

This theorem has also been called the Stieltjes–Osgood theorem, after Thomas Joannes Stieltjes and William Fogg Osgood.

The Corollary stated above is deduced as follows. Suppose that all the functions in $\mathcal{F}$ omit the same neighborhood of the point $z_1$. By postcomposing with the map $z\mapsto \frac{1}{z-z_1}$ we obtain a uniformly bounded family, which is normal by the first version of the theorem.

The second version of Montel's theorem can be deduced from the first by using the fact that there exists a holomorphic universal covering from the unit disk to the twice punctured plane $\mathbb{C}\setminus\{a,b\}$. (Such a covering is given by the elliptic modular function).

This version of Montel's theorem can be also derived from Picard's theorem, by using Zalcman's lemma.

== Relationship to theorems for entire functions ==
A heuristic principle known as Bloch's principle (made precise by Zalcman's lemma) states that properties that imply that an entire function is constant correspond to properties that ensure that a family of holomorphic functions is normal.

For example, the first version of Montel's theorem stated above is the analog of Liouville's theorem, while the second version corresponds to Picard's theorem.

== See also ==
- Montel space
- Fundamental normality test
- Riemann mapping theorem
