= Frédéric Marty =

French mathematician

Frédéric Ladislas Joseph Marty (23 June 1911 in Albi, Tarn – 14 June 1940, Gulf of Finland) was a French mathematician.

Frédéric Marty's father was the mathematician Joseph Marty (1885–1914), who taught at the lycée d'Albi and as a French army officer was killed in action in WW I.

Frédéric Marty received his doctorate in 1931 from the École normale supérieure (ENS). After that he was a maître de conférences at Aix-Marseille University. He was a French Air Force lieutenant in WW II and was a victim of the Aero Flight 1631 shootdown when he was a diplomatic courier on board a Finnish plane that was shot down by the Soviet Air Force.

Frédéric Marty, who entered the ENS in 1928, wrote, between 1931 and 1937, several papers on the distribution of the values of a meromorphic function, algebraic functions, and coverings. He was one of the devotees of the Hadamard Seminar and he also wrote two talks for the Julia Seminar.

Marty is known in the theory of normal families for Marty's theorem. This theorem from his dissertation states that for any family $F$ of meromorphic functions, $F$ is normal if and only if $F$'s derived family of spherical derivatives is locally bounded. Marty also founded the theory of hypergroups and hyperstructures. He was an invited speaker at the International Congress of Mathematics (ICM) 1936 in Oslo.
