= André Bloch =

André Bloch may refer to:

- André Bloch (composer) (1873–1960), French composer
- André Bloch (mathematician) (1893–1948), French mathematician
