= Anders Wiman =

Swedish mathematician

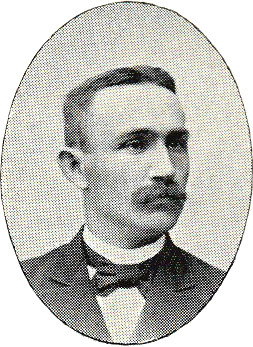
- Born: 11 February 1865; Hammarlöv, Malmöhus County
- Died: 13 August 1959 (aged 94); Lund
- Education: Lund University
- Scientific career
- Fields: Mathematics
- Workplaces: Uppsala University
- Doctoral advisor: Carl Fabian Björling
- Doctoral students: Arne Beurling; Fritz Carlson

Anders Wiman (11 February 1865 – 13 August 1959) was a Swedish mathematician. He is known for his work in algebraic geometry and applications of group theory.

== Life ==
Wiman was born to well-off land-owing farmer family in Hammarlöv, Sweden in 1865. He attended school in Lund, and graduated from secondary school in 1885. In the autumn of the same year, Wiman went to Lund University studying Mathematics, Botany and Latin. He attained Bachelor's degree in 1887 and his Licentiate in 1891. He continued his study in the same university under supervision of Carl Fabian Björling and was awarded doctorate in 1892, with thesis Klassifikation af regelytorna af sjette graden (Classification of regular surfaces of degree 6).

In 1892, Wiman was appointed as a docent (equivalent of assistant professor) in Lund University. There, his work on the classification of finite geometrical groups in the last few years of the 19th century was seen impressive. He classified all algebraic curves of genus 3, 4, 5 and 6 which have non-trivial algebraic automorphisms. In a paper for approximations to small denominators in 1900, Wiman applied measure theory to the probabilistic problem, and became the first person to do so.

In 1901, Wiman accepted an extraordinary professorship in algebra and number theory at Uppsala University. Topics he studied here included solubility of algebraic equations, Galois group of soluble equations of prime degree, and entire functions. Wiman was promoted to an ordinary professor in 1906, and held the chair at Uppsala until 1929. In that year, Wiman was made professor emeritus, but he remained active in teaching.

In 1904 Wiman was an Invited Speaker of the ICM in Heidelberg. Wiman was from 1908 an editor of Acta Mathematica.

Wiman returned to Lund in his final year, and stayed there until he died.

== Awards and honours ==
He was a member of the:

- Royal Physiographic Society in Lund (1900)
- Royal Society of Sciences in Uppsala (1905)
- Royal Swedish Academy of Sciences (1905)
- Royal Society of Arts and Sciences in Gothenburg (1920);

He was also an honorary member of the Royal Society of Sciences in Uppsala (1938).

== Work ==
The main focus of Wiman's research was algebraic geometry and applications of group theory to geometry and function theory. He proved that for n > 7, in less than n–2 dimensions, there are no groups of collineations that are isomorphic to the symmetric or alternating group on n symbols. He also determined all finite groups of birational transformations of the plane. Wiman wrote the article on finite groups of linear transformations for Klein's encyclopedia.

In function theory he did important work on entire functions. From 1914 to 1916 he introduced what is now called Wiman-Valiron theory (named after him and Georges Valiron). Wiman's generalization of a theorem of Hadamard is known as Wiman's theorem. Wiman's theorems for quasiregular mappings shows that an entire holomorphic function of order less than 1/2 has a minimum modulus converging to along a sequence.

He also introduced Wiman's sextic curve, the Wiman inequality, and the Wiman bound.

His investigations on the zeros of the derivatives of entire functions — along with similar investigations by George Pólya – had a great influence on the theory of entire functions; in particular, the now-proved Wiman conjecture, and the now-proved Pólya-Wiman conjecture have inspired much research.

== Notable PhD students ==
Arne Beurling (1933) and Fritz Carlson (1914) were among his students in Uppsala University.
