= Fundamental normality test =

In complex analysis, a mathematical discipline, the fundamental normality test gives sufficient conditions to test the normality of a family of analytic functions. It is another name for the stronger version of Montel's theorem.

== Statement ==
Let $\mathcal{F}$ be a family of analytic functions defined on a domain $\Omega$. If there are two fixed complex numbers a and b such that for all ƒ ∈ $\mathcal{F}$ and all $x \in \Omega$, $f(x) \not\in \{a, b\}$, then $\mathcal{F}$ is a normal family on $\Omega$.

The proof relies on properties of the elliptic modular function and can be found here: J. L. Schiff (1993). Normal Families. Springer-Verlag. ISBN 0-387-97967-0.

== See also ==
- Montel's theorem
