= Jean Kuntzmann =

French mathematician (1912–1992)

- Born: 1 June 1912; Pont-à-Mousson
- Died: 18 December 1992 (aged 80); Grenoble
- Education: University of Paris
- Scientific career
- Fields: Mathematics; Computer science
- Workplaces: Joseph Fourier University
- Doctoral advisor: Georges Valiron
- Doctoral students: François Jaeger

Jean Kuntzmann (1 June 1912 – 18 December 1992) was a French mathematician, known for his works in applied mathematics and computer science, pushing and developing both fields at a very early time.

Kuntzmann earned his Ph.D. in mathematics from the University of Paris under supervision of Georges Valiron (thesis: Contribution à l'étude des systèmes multiformes).

In 1960, he established the École nationale supérieure d'informatique et de mathématiques appliquées de Grenoble.
