= Wiman's sextic =

Mathematical plane curve

In mathematics, Wiman's sextic is a degree 6 plane curve with four nodes studied by Anders Wiman (1896). It is given by the equation (in homogeneous coordinates)

$$x^6+y^6+z^6 + (x^2+y^2+z^2)(x^4+y^4+z^4)=12 x^2y^2z^2$$

Its normalization is a genus 6 curve with automorphism group isomorphic to the symmetric group S_{5}.
