= François Jaeger =

French mathematician (1947-1997)

- Born: December 14, 1947; Boulogne-Billancourt, Hauts-de-Seine, France
- Died: August 18, 1997 (aged 49); La Tronche, Auvergne-Rhône-Alpes, France
- Education: École Polytechnique; University of Grenoble
- Scientific career
- Fields: graph theory matroid theory knot theory
- Workplaces: Joseph Fourier University
- Doctoral advisor: Jean Kuntzmann; Charles Payan

François Philippe Louis Jaeger (14 December 1947 - 18 August 1997) was a French mathematician, working in graph theory, matroid theory, and knot theory.

== Education and career ==
Jaeger was born in Boulogne-Billancourt to a father who was a doctor and a mother who was a pharmacist but did not practice in order to be able to take care of the education of her three children. According to his father, he was particularly interested in mathematics from an early age.

In 1967, he was admitted to the École Polytechnique in Paris. In 1970, after graduating, he started a thesis in Grenoble with Jean Kuntzmann at the IMAG laboratory in the Algebra, Logic and Combinatorics team. This team later became the laboratory Logique, Structures Discrètes et Didactique (LSD2, Grenoble 1982-1995) and was subsequently integrated into the Leibniz laboratory (1995-2005). Jaeger also met frequently with mathematicians from the University of Geneva and from the Institut Fourier (Grenoble), in particular Yves Colin de Verdière. Jaeger was hired by the French National Centre for Scientific Research as a permanent researcher in Grenoble in 1971, at the same time as his close colleague, collaborator and friend Charles Payan, and he spent his entire career in this organisation. He defended his PhD thesis "Study of some invariants and existence problems in graph theory" on June 8, 1976 (supervised by Jean Kuntzmann and Charles Payan).

Jaeger died on August 18, 1997 in La Tronche from a lung cancer, at the age of 49.

== Research ==
Initially, most of his research themes had as their main subject graphs, hypergraphs and matroids, and were linked to famous and difficult problems in Graph coloring and nowhere-zero flows, such as the Four color theorem, the Strong perfect graph theorem, and Tutte's 3-flow, 4-flow, and 5-flow conjectures. Gradually the research themes of Jaeger became more and more linked to algebra and topology, to knot theory, with also an interest in statistical physics and computational complexity.

Jaeger is known for a number of conjectures in graph theory (see for instance the Petersen coloring conjecture) and linear algebra. In addition to his research work, he wrote several surveys on various topics, including the Cycle double cover conjecture, link invariants, and nowhere-zero flows.

== Honors ==
A year after his death, his colleagues organized a symposium in his memory in Grenoble, attended by international experts in graph theory, combinatorial optimization, matroid theory, and knot theory, including Claude Berge, Jack Edmonds, Vaughan Jones, Alexander Schrijver, Paul Seymour, William Tutte, and Dominic Welsh. A 1998 volume of the Banach Center Publications (Polish Academy of Sciences) was dedicated to his memory and a 1999 special volume of the Annales de l'Institut Fourier was also published in his honor.
