= Alexandre Eremenko =

Ukrainian-American mathematician

- Олександр Єременко
- Born: 1954 (age 71–72); Kharkiv, Ukrainian SSR, Soviet Union (now Ukraine)
- Occupation: Mathematician

Alexandre Emanuilovych Eremenko (Note: Ukrainian: Олександр Емануїлович Єременко, romanized: Oleksandr Emanuilovych Yeremenko) (born 1954) is a Ukrainian-American mathematician who works in the fields of complex analysis and dynamical systems.

== Academic career ==
Eremenko was born into a medical family in Kharkiv, Ukraine. His father was a pathophysiologist, professor and head of the Department of pathophysiology at Ternopil National Medical University. His mother was an ophthalmologist. He obtained his master's degree from Lviv University in 1976 and worked in the Institute of Low temperature Physics and Engineering in Kharkiv until 1990. He received his PhD from Rostov State University in 1979 (Asymptotic Properties of Meromorphic and Subharmonic Functions), and is currently a distinguished professor at Purdue University. He had visiting positions in University of Kentucky, MSRI, Imperial College, University of Liverpool, University of Paris XII, University of Kiel, Bar Ilan University, Technion, Weizmann Institute and University of Tel Aviv.

In complex dynamics, Eremenko explored escaping sets at the iteration of transcendental entire functions and conjectured that the connected components of this escaping set are unbounded (Eremenko's conjecture). For decades, the conjecture remained open, and has been called "one of the most famous open problems in transcendental dynamics"; a counterexample was found in 2025.

== Distinctions ==
Eremenko was a recipient of the Humboldt Prize in Mathematics. In 2013, he became a fellow of the American Mathematical Society, for "contributions to value distribution theory, geometric function theory, and other areas of analysis and complex dynamics". He was an invited speaker in the International congress of mathematicians in Beijing in 2002.

== See also ==
- Escaping set
- Polynomial lemniscate
- Gravity train
- Paul Eremenko
