= Bloch's principle =

Bloch's principle is a philosophical principle in mathematics stated by André Bloch.

Bloch states the principle in Latin as: Nihil est in infinito quod non prius fuerit in finito, and explains this as follows: Every proposition in whose statement the actual infinity occurs can be always considered a consequence, almost immediate, of a proposition where it does not occur, a proposition in finite terms.

Bloch mainly applied this principle to the theory of functions of a complex variable. Thus, for example, according to this principle, Picard's theorem corresponds to Schottky's theorem, and Valiron's theorem corresponds to Bloch's theorem.

Based on his Principle, Bloch was able to predict or conjecture several important results such as the Ahlfors's Five Islands theorem, Cartan's theorem on holomorphic curves omitting hyperplanes, Hayman's result that an exceptional set of radii is unavoidable in Nevanlinna theory.

In the more recent times several general theorems were proved which can be regarded as rigorous statements in the spirit of the Bloch Principle:

== Zalcman's lemma ==
A family $\mathcal F$ of functions meromorphic on the unit disc $\Delta$ is not normal if and only if there exist:

- a number $0 < r < 1$
- points $z_n,$ $|z_n|<r$
- functions $f_n \in \mathcal F$
- numbers $\rho_n \to 0 +$

such that $f_n(z_n+\rho_n \zeta)\to g(\zeta),$ spherically uniformly on compact subsets of $C,$ where $g$ is a nonconstant meromorphic function on $C.$

Zalcman's lemma may be generalized to several complex variables. First, define the following:

A family $\mathcal F$ of holomorphic functions on a domain $\Omega\subset C^n$ is normal in $\Omega$ if every sequence of functions $\{f_j\}\subseteq \mathcal F$ contains either a subsequence which converges to a limit function $f \ne \infty$ uniformly on each compact subset of $\Omega,$ or a subsequence which converges uniformly to $\infty$ on each compact subset.

For every function $\varphi$ of class $C^2(\Omega)$ define at each point $z\in \Omega$ a Hermitian form $L_z(\varphi, v):=\sum_{k,l=1}^n \frac{\partial^2\varphi}{\partial z_k \partial \overline{z}_l}(z) v_k \overline{v}_l \ \ (v\in C^n),$ and call it the Levi form of the function $\varphi$ at $z.$

If function $f$ is holomorphic on $\Omega,$ set $f^\sharp (z):=\sup_{ |v|=1}\sqrt{L_z(\log(1+|f|^2), v)}.$ This quantity is well defined since the Levi form $L_z(\log(1+|f|^2), v)$ is nonnegative for all $z\in \Omega.$ In particular, for $n = 1$ the above formula takes the form $f^\sharp (z):=\frac{|f'(z)|}{1+|f(z)|^2}$ and $z^\sharp$ coincides with the spherical metric on $C.$

The following characterization of normality can be made based on Marty's theorem, which states that a family is normal if and only if the spherical derivatives are locally bounded:

Suppose that the family $\mathcal F$ of functions holomorphic on $\Omega\subset C^n$ is not normal at some point $z_0\in \Omega.$ Then there exist sequences $f_j\in \mathcal F,$ $z_j\to z_0,$ $\rho_j=1/f_j^\sharp(z_j)\to 0,$ such that the sequence $g_j(z)=f_j(z_j+\rho_j z)$ converges locally uniformly in $C^n$ to a non-constant entire function $g$ satisfying $g^\sharp(z)\leq g^\sharp(0)=1$

== Brody's lemma ==
Let X be a compact complex analytic manifold, such that every holomorphic map from the complex plane to X is constant. Then there exists a metric on X such that every holomorphic map from the unit disc with the Poincaré metric to X does not increase distances.
