= André Bloch (mathematician) =

French mathematician (1893–1948)

André Bloch (20 November 1893 – 11 October 1948) was a French mathematician who is best remembered for his fundamental contribution to complex analysis.

Bloch killed three of his family members, for which he was institutionalized in a mental asylum for 31 years, during which all of his mathematical output was produced.

== Early life ==
André Bloch was born in 1893 to a Jewish family in Besançon, France. He was the eldest son in his family, his younger brother is Georges Bloch and his youngest brother is Henry Bloch. According to one of his teachers, Georges Valiron, both André Bloch and his younger brother Georges Bloch were in the same class in October 1910. Valiron believed Georges to have the better talent, and due to lack of preparation, André finished last in the class. André was spared from failing the class by convincing Ernest Vessiot to give him an oral exam. The exam convinced Vessiot of Andre's talent and both André and Georges entered the École Polytechnique.

Both brothers served for a year in the military prior to World War I. Both André and Georges studied for only one year at the École Polytechnique before the outbreak of the war.

== World War I ==
Upon the outbreak of World War I in 1914, André and Georges Bloch were drafted. André, as a second-lieutenant in the artillery, was assigned to the headquarters of General de Castelnau in Nancy.

Both Bloch brothers were injured: André suffered a fall from an observation post, while Georges sustained a head wound which cost him an eye. Georges was released from service and returned to the École Polytechnique on 7 October 1917. André, however, was allowed to convalesce but not released from duty.

== Murder ==
On 17 November 1917, while on convalescent leave from service in World War I, Bloch killed his brother Georges and his aunt and uncle. Several conjectures about the motives for Bloch's crime exist among mathematicians. However, Cartan and Ferrand quote Henri Baruk, who was the medical head of the asylum where Bloch was confined. Bloch told Baruk that the murders were a eugenic act, in order to eliminate branches of his family affected by mental illness.

== Commitment and mathematical career ==
After the murders, Bloch was committed to the asylum at Charenton in Saint Maurice, a suburb of Paris. Bloch continued his mathematical career while confined. All of his publications, including those relating to Bloch's constant, were written while he was committed. Bloch corresponded with several mathematicians, including Georges Valiron, George Pólya, Jacques Hadamard and others, giving his return address as only "57 Grande rue, Saint-Maurice", never mentioning that this was in a psychiatric hospital. Several of his correspondents were thus unaware of his confinement.

During the German occupation of France, Bloch (who was Jewish) wrote under aliases, in order to avoid advertising his presence to Nazi occupiers. In particular, Bloch is known to have authored papers under the names of René Binaud and Marcel Segond during this time.

According to Pólya, Bloch had the habit of dating his letters with 1 April, regardless of when they were written.

Bloch was transferred to the Sainte-Anne Hospital in Paris on 21 August 1948 for an operation. He died from leukemia in Paris on 11 October 1948.

== Mathematical work ==
Most important works of Bloch belong to complex analysis.

His early contribution is known as Bloch's theorem. This theorem asserts the existence of a certain absolute constant which is called the Bloch constant. The exact value of the Bloch constant is still unknown as of 2026. Research originating from this theorem led to introduction of Bloch's functions which form the so-called Bloch space. (This usage should not be confused with Bloch's functions of Swiss physicist Felix Bloch.)

Bloch formulated two important philosophical principles which proved to be useful in research in complex analysis. The more famous of these two is the so-called Bloch's principle. In Bloch's own words it is formulated (in Latin) as follows: "Nihil est in infinito quod non prius fuerit in finito", translated as "There is nothing in the infinite that did not exist before in the finite". Guided by this principle, Bloch was able to discover several important facts which were later proved by other mathematicians, for example, the five-island theorem. There is an intensive current research related to Bloch's principle.

Bloch's ideas stimulated much of the research on holomorphic curves in the 20th century and remain central in this subfield. He stated a fundamental theorem on holomorphic curves in complex manifolds whose irregularity exceeds dimension. (This can be considered as a deep and far-reaching generalization of Picard's theorem.) His proof of this theorem contained gaps (which he recognized), and later the theorem was known as "Bloch's conjecture". Bloch's conjecture, as stated, was proved by Takushiro Ochiai, Pit Man Wong, and simultaneously by Yujiro Kawamata in 1980, and the related research started a new area which is called holomorphic curves in Abelian varieties (and semi-Abelian varieties).

Bloch was the first (jointly with Pólya) to consider the distribution of roots of random polynomials, which is another area of research which is intensively developing since the middle of 20th century.
