= Escaping set =

Concept in complex dynamics

In mathematics, and particularly complex dynamics, the escaping set of an entire function $f$ consists of all points that tend to infinity under the repeated application of $f$. That is, a complex number $z_0\in\mathbb{C}$ belongs to the escaping set if and only if the sequence defined by $z_{n+1} := f(z_n)$ converges to infinity as $n$ gets large. The escaping set of $f$ is denoted by $I(f)$.

For example, for $f(z)=e^z$, the origin $z=0$ belongs to the escaping set, since the sequence $0,1,e,e^e,e^{e^e},\dots$ tends to infinity.

== History ==
The iteration of transcendental entire functions was first studied by Pierre Fatou in 1926. The escaping set occurs implicitly in his study of the explicit entire functions $f(z)=z+1+\exp(-z)$ and $f(z)=c\sin(z)$.

Unsolved problem in mathematics
Can the escaping set of a transcendental entire function have a bounded component?
More unsolved problems in mathematics

The first study of the escaping set for a general transcendental entire function is due to Alexandre Eremenko who used Wiman-Valiron theory. He conjectured that every connected component of the escaping set of a transcendental entire function is unbounded. This has become known as Eremenko's conjecture. In 2021, a paper by Martí-Pete, Rempe, and Waterman constructed a counterexample to Eremenko's conjecture.

Eremenko also asked whether every escaping point can be connected to infinity by a curve in the escaping set; it was later shown that this is not the case. Indeed, there exist entire functions whose escaping sets do not contain any curves at all.

== Properties ==
The following properties are known to hold for the escaping set of any non-constant and non-linear entire function. (Here nonlinear means that the function is not of the form $f(z)=az+b$.)

- The escaping set contains at least one point. (Note: Theorem 1 of (Eremenko, 1989))
- The boundary of the escaping set is exactly the Julia set. (Note: See (Eremenko, 1989), formula (1) on p. 339 and l.2 of p. 340) In particular, the escaping set is never closed.
- For a transcendental entire function, the escaping set always intersects the Julia set. (Note: Theorem 2 of (Eremenko, 1989)) In particular, the escaping set is open if and only if $f$ is a polynomial.
- Every connected component of the closure of the escaping set is unbounded. (Note: Theorem 3 of (Eremenko, 1989))
- The escaping set always has at least one unbounded connected component.
- The escaping set is connected or has infinitely many components.
- The set $I(f)\cup \{\infty\}$ is connected.

Note that the final statement does not imply Eremenko's Conjecture. (Indeed, there exist connected spaces in which the removal of a single dispersion point leaves the remaining space totally disconnected.)

== Examples ==
=== Polynomials ===
A polynomial of degree 2 extends to an analytic self-map of the Riemann sphere, having a super-attracting fixed point at infinity. The escaping set is precisely the basin of attraction of this fixed point, and hence usually referred to as the **basin of infinity**. In this case, $I(f)$ is an open and connected subset of the complex plane, and the Julia set is the boundary of this basin.

For instance the escaping set of the complex quadratic polynomial $f(z) = z^2$ consists precisely of the complement of the closed unit disc:

$$I(f) = \{z\in\mathbb{C} \colon |z|  > 1 \}.$$

=== Transcendental entire functions ===
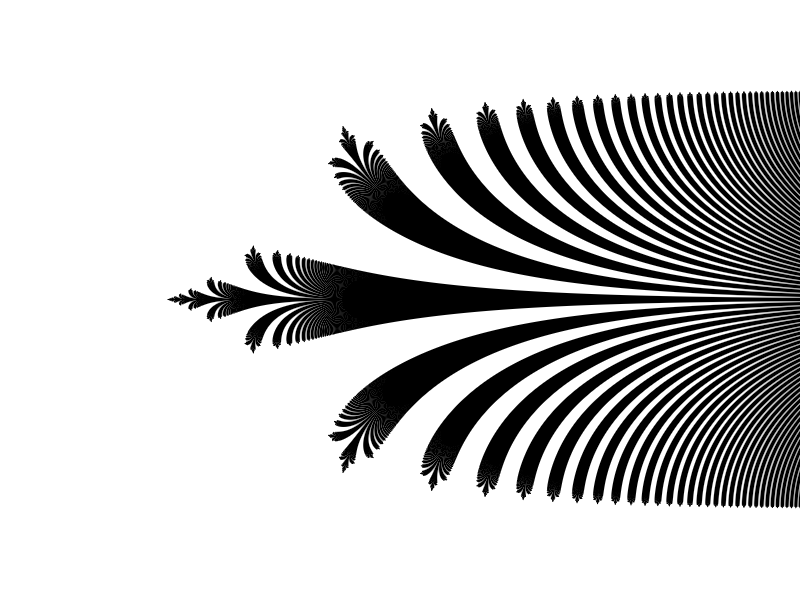
Escaping set of $(\exp(z)-1)/2$.

For transcendental entire functions, the escaping set is much more complicated than for polynomials: in the simplest cases like the one illustrated in the picture it consists of uncountably many curves, called hairs or rays. In other examples the structure of the escaping set can be very different (a spider's web). As mentioned above, there are examples of transcendental entire functions whose escaping set contains no curves.

By definition, the escaping set is an $F_{\sigma\delta}\text{ set}$. It is neither $G_{\delta}$ nor $F_{\sigma}$. For functions in the exponential class $\exp(z)+a$, the escaping set is not $G_{\delta\sigma}$.

A comprehensive survey of escaping sets of transcendental functions is given in the paper of Bergweiler and Rempe.

== See also ==
- Plotting algorithms for the Mandelbrot set § Escape time algorithm
- target set
