= Château de Bonneval =

Castle in Nouvelle-Aquitaine, France

Coordinates: 45.5120°N 1.3256°E

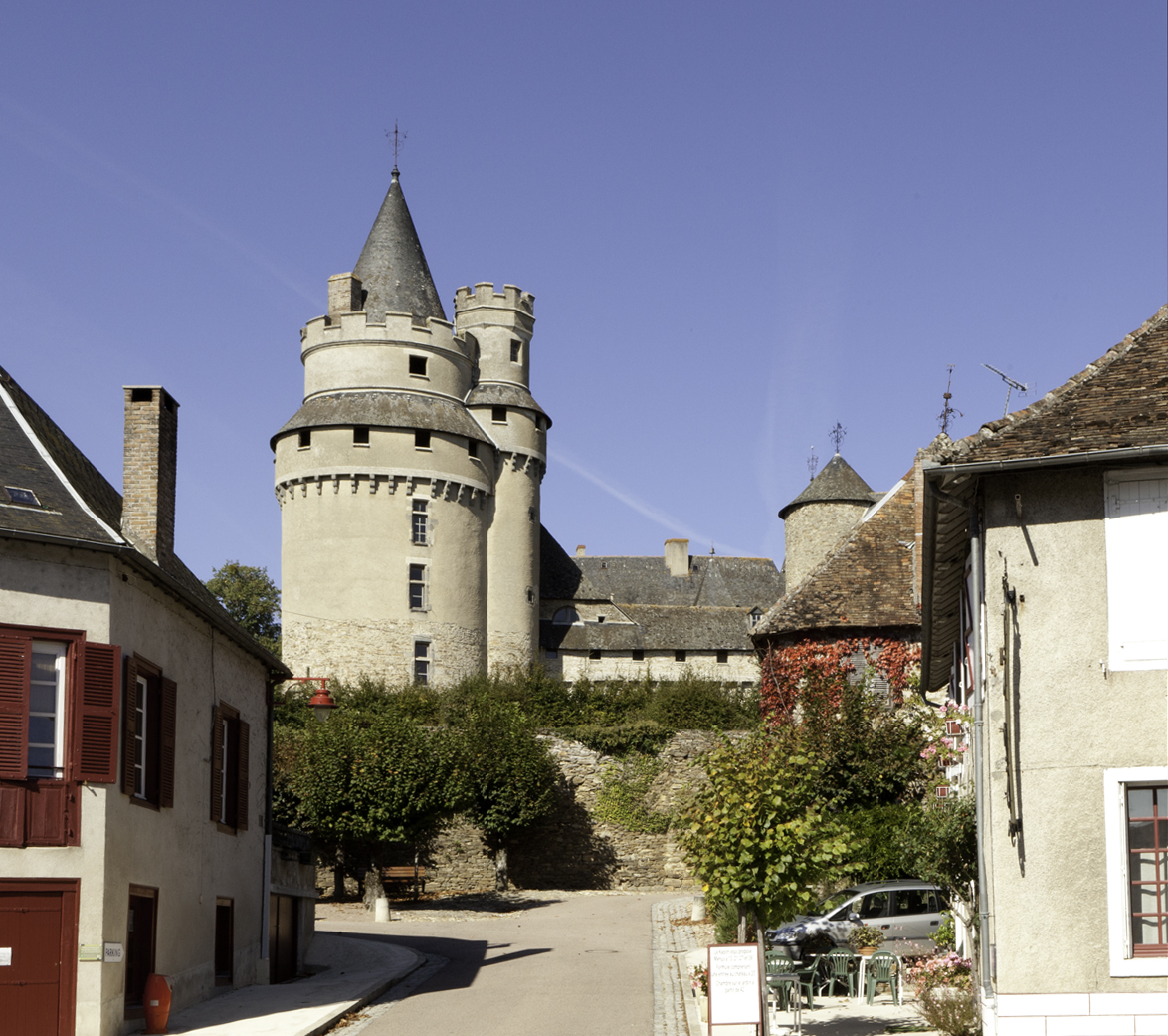
Château de Bonneval

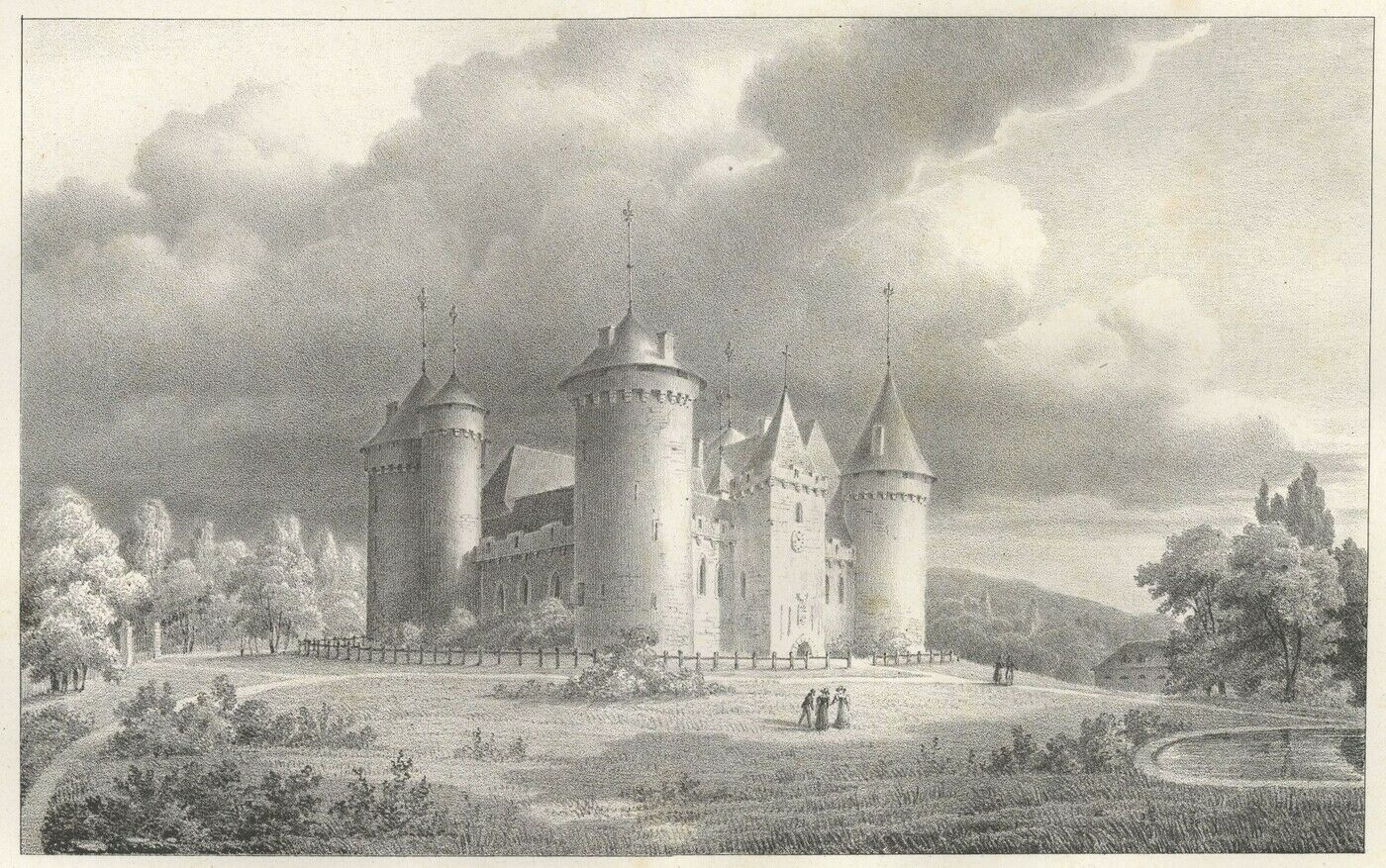
Château de Bonneval, lithograph by C. Molle from a drawing by Charles-Caïus Renoux

The Château de Bonneval is a castle in the commune of Coussac-Bonneval in the Haute-Vienne département of France.

It is notable for belonging to the same family since its construction, including Claude-Alexandre de Bonneval (1675-1747), who was given the title of Pasha after his conversion to Islam and his service with the Ottoman Empire.

== History ==
A fortress has existed here since at least 930 (1095 years ago), as is shown by a stone bearing that date in the masonry of the entrance tower.

The castle in its present state dates from the 14th century, probably constructed by Jean I, seigneur of Bonneval. It underwent modifications in the 18th and 19th centuries; the southwest façade between the two corner towers dates to 1780.

The castle underwent a restoration in 1771-72 under the direction of the architect Broussaud, and another in 1900, in the Renaissance courtyard.

There is also an old legend about the devil who turned at the gates of the chateau one night in the guise of a vagabond lord but was exposed.

== Description ==
The castle is built on a quadrangular plan, with corner towers with machicolations and pepperpot roofs. The château is furnished with pieces from between the Renaissance and Directoire periods. It has portraits of and documents about Claude-Alexandre de Bonneval. Among its furnishings are tapestries from Aubusson and Fontainebleau.

The castle is privately owned. It has been listed since 1960 as a monument historique by the French Ministry of Culture. Guided tours of the Château de Bonneval are available from late-June to mid-September, and on various dates in May.

== See also ==
- List of castles in France
