= Hyperstructure =

Algebraic structure equipped with at least one multivalued operation

Hyperstructures are algebraic structures equipped with at least one multi-valued operation, called a hyperoperation. The largest classes of the hyperstructures are the ones called $Hv$ – structures.

A hyperoperation $(\star)$ on a nonempty set $H$ is a mapping from $H \times H$ to the nonempty power set $P^{*}\!(H)$, meaning the set of all nonempty subsets of $H$, i.e.

$$\star: H \times H \to P^{*}\!(H)$$
$$\quad\ (x,y) \mapsto x \star y \subseteq H.$$

For $A,B \subseteq H$ we define

$A \star B = \bigcup_{a \in A,\, b \in B} a \star b$ and $A \star x = A \star \{ x \},\,$ $x \star B = \{x\} \star B.$

$(H, \star )$ is a semihypergroup if $(\star)$ is an associative hyperoperation, i.e. $x \star (y \star z) = (x \star y)\star z$ for all $x, y, z \in H.$

Furthermore, a hypergroup is a semihypergroup $(H, \star )$, where the reproduction axiom is valid, i.e. $a \star H = H \star a = H$ for all $a \in H.$
