= Ahlfors theory =

Mathematical theory

Ahlfors theory is a mathematical theory invented by Lars Ahlfors as a geometric counterpart of the Nevanlinna theory. Ahlfors was awarded one of the two very first Fields Medals for this theory in 1936.

It can be considered as a generalization of the basic properties of covering maps to the maps which are "almost coverings" in some well defined sense. It applies to bordered Riemann surfaces equipped with conformal Riemannian metrics.

== Preliminaries ==
A bordered Riemann surface X can be defined as a region on a compact Riemann surface whose boundary ∂X consists of finitely many disjoint Jordan curves. In most applications these curves are piecewise analytic, but there is some explicit minimal regularity condition on these curves which is necessary to make the theory work; it is called the Ahlfors regularity. A conformal Riemannian metric is defined by a length element ds which is expressed in conformal local coordinates z as ds = ρ(z) |dz|, where ρ is a smooth positive function with isolated zeros. If the zeros are absent, then the metric is called smooth. The length element defines the lengths of rectifiable curves and areas of regions by the formulas

$$\ell(\gamma)=\int_\gamma \rho(z) \, |dz|,\quad A(D)=\int_D\rho^2(x+iy) \, dx \, dy, \quad z=x+iy.$$

Then the distance between two points is defined as the infimum of the lengths of the curves connecting these points.

== Setting and notation ==
Let X and Y be two bordered Riemann surfaces, and suppose that Y is equipped with a smooth (including the boundary) conformal metric σ(z) dz. Let f be a holomorphic map from X to Y. Then there exists the pull-back metric on X, which is defined by

$$\rho(z)|dz|=\sigma(f(z))|f^{\prime}(z)||dz|. \,$$

When X is equipped with this metric, f becomes a local isometry; that is, the length of a curve equals to the length of its image. All lengths and areas on X and Y are measured with respect to these two metrics.

If f sends the boundary of X to the boundary of Y, then f is a ramified covering. In particular,

a) Each point has the same (finite) number of preimages, counting multiplicity. This number is the degree of the covering.

b) The Riemann–Hurwitz formula holds, in particular, the Euler characteristic of X is at most the Euler characteristic of Y times the degree.

Now suppose that some part of the boundary of X is mapped to the interior of Y. This part is called the relative boundary. Let L be the length of this relative boundary.

== First main theorem ==
The average covering number is defined by the formula

$$S=\frac{A(X)}{A(Y)}.$$

This number is a generalization of the degree of a covering. Similarly, for every regular curve γ and for every regular region D in Y the average covering numbers are defined:

$$S(D)=\frac{A(f^{-1}(D))}{A(D)},\quad S(\gamma)=\frac{\ell(f^{-1}(\gamma))}{\ell(\gamma)}.$$

The First Main Theorem says that for every regular region and every regular curve,

$$|S-S(D)|\leq kL,\quad |S-S(\gamma)|\leq kL,$$

where L is the length of the relative boundary, and k is the constant that may depend only on Y, σ, D and γ, but is independent of f and X. When L = 0 these inequalities become a weak analog of the property a) of coverings.

== Second main theorem ==
Let ρ be the negative of the Euler characteristic (so that ρ = 2m − 2 for the sphere with m holes). Then

$$\max\{\rho(X),0\}\geq S\rho(Y)-kL, \,$$

This is meaningful only when ρ(Y) > 0, for example when Y is a sphere with three (or more) holes. In this case, the result can be considered as a generalization of the property b) of coverings.

== Applications ==
Suppose now that Z is an open Riemann surface, for example the complex plane or the unit disc, and let Z be equipped with a conformal metric ds. We say that (Z,ds) is regularly exhaustible if there is an increasing sequence of bordered surfaces D_{j} contained in Z with their closures, whose union in Z, and such that

$$\frac{\ell(\partial(D_j))}{A(D_j)}\to 0,\; j\to\infty.$$

Ahlfors proved that the complex plane with arbitrary conformal metric is regularly exhaustible. This fact, together with the two main theorems implies Picard's theorem, and the Second main theorem of Nevanlinna theory. Many other important generalizations of Picard's theorem can be obtained from Ahlfors theory.

One especially striking result (conjectured earlier by André Bloch) is the Five Island theorem.

== Five-island theorem ==
Let D_{1},...,D_{5} be five Jordan regions on the Riemann sphere with disjoint closures. Then there exists a constant c, depending only on these regions, and having the following property:

Let f be a meromorphic function in the unit disc such that the spherical derivative satisfies

$$\frac{|f'(0)|}{1+|f(0)|^2}\geq c.$$

Then there is a simply connected region G contained with its closure in the unit disc, such that f maps G onto one of the regions D_{j} homeomorphically.

This does not hold with four regions. Take, for example f(z) = ℘(Kz), where K > 0 is arbitrarily large, and ℘ is the Weierstrass elliptic function satisfying the differential equation

$$(\wp^\prime)^2=4(\wp-e_1)(\wp-e_2)(\wp-e_3).$$

All preimages of the four points e_{1},e_{2},e_{3},∞ are multiple, so if we take four discs with disjoint closures around these points, there will be no region which is mapped on any of these discs homeomorphically.

== Remarks ==
Besides Ahlfors' original journal paper, the theory is explained in books. Simplified proofs of the Second Main Theorem can be found in the papers of Toki and de Thelin.

A simple proof of the Five Island Theorem, not relying on Ahlfors' theory, was developed by Bergweiler.
