= Jakow Trachtenberg =

Ukrainian-Jewish mathematician (1888–1951)

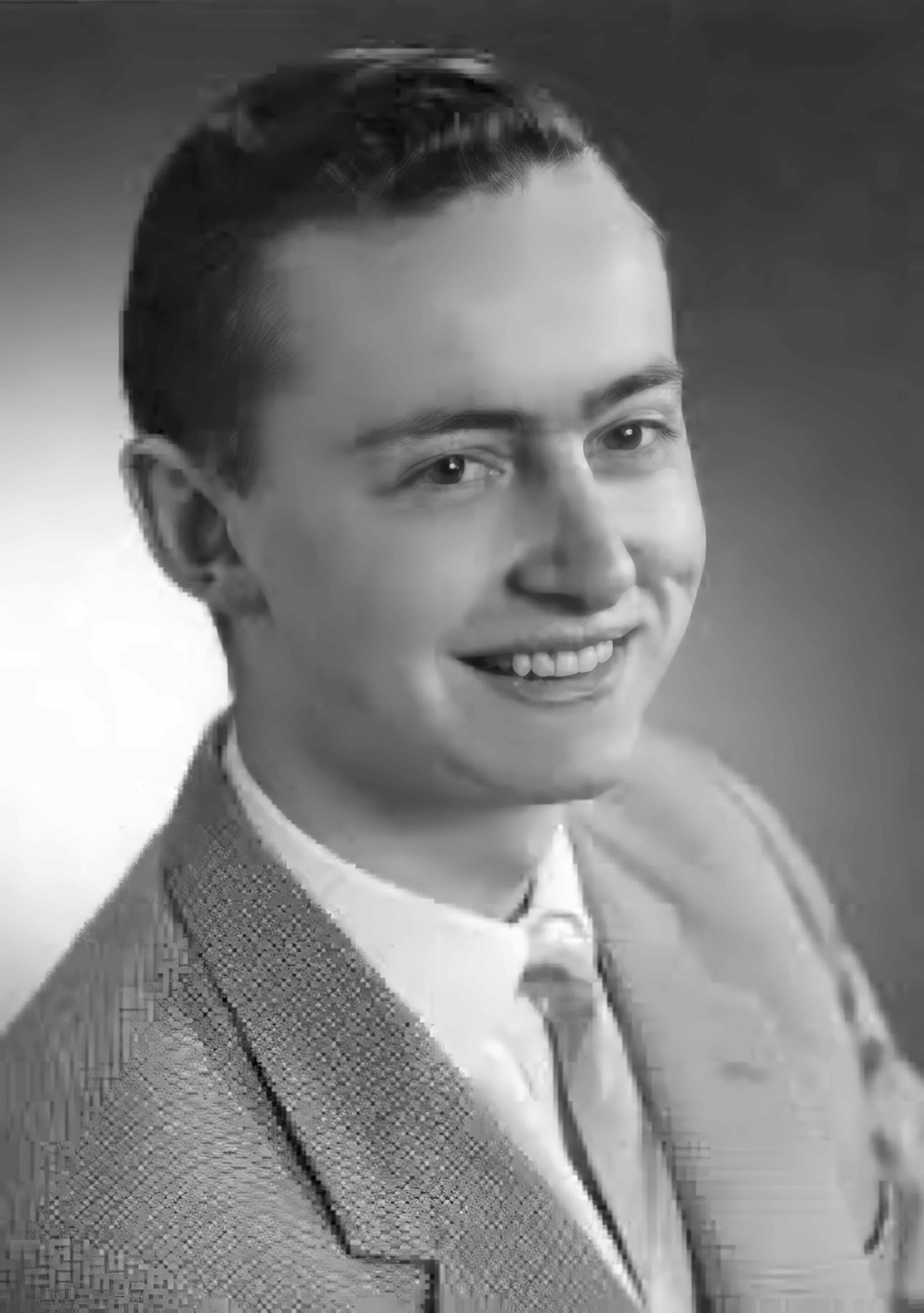
- Trachtenberg in 1915
- Born: June 17, 1888; Odessa, Russian Empire
- Died: October 26, 1951 (aged 63); Switzerland
- Known for: Trachtenberg system

Jakow Trachtenberg (17 June 1888 – 26 October 1951) was a Jewish mathematician who developed the mental calculation techniques called the Trachtenberg system.

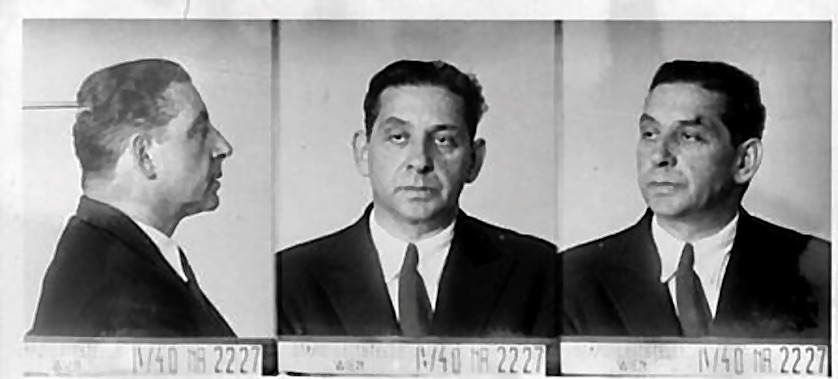
Trachtenberg in a Gestapo mugshot, 1940

He was born in Odessa, in the Russian Empire (modern Ukraine) to Jewish parents. He graduated with highest honors from the Mining Engineering Institute in St. Petersburg and later worked as an engineer in the Obukhov arms factory. While still in his early twenties, he became Chief Engineer with 11,000 men under his supervision. The Tsarist government gave him the responsibility of supervising the formation of a well-developed navy.

Trachtenberg was a dedicated pacifist. When war broke out in 1914, he was instrumental in organising a society known as the Society of Good Samaritans. The idea was to train Russian students to take care of the wounded. It also had a special recognition from Tsar Nicholas II. He was against violence of any sort despite having a leading position in tsarist arms production.

After the Russian Revolutions of 1917, Trachtenberg fled to the Weimar Republic where he became critical of Nazi policies. He was imprisoned in a Nazi concentration camp during World War II. He developed his system of mental arithmetic during his imprisonment. He later fled to Switzerland. He died in 1951.

== See also ==
- List of peace activists
