= Normal family =

Mathematical term in complex analysis

In mathematics, with special application to complex analysis, a normal family is a pre-compact subset of the space of continuous functions. Informally, this means that the functions in the family are not widely spread out, but rather stick together in a somewhat "clustered" manner. Note that a compact family of continuous functions is automatically a normal family. Sometimes, if each function in a normal family F satisfies a particular property (e.g. is holomorphic), then the property also holds for each limit point of the set F.

More formally, let X and Y be topological spaces. The set of continuous functions $f: X \to Y$ has a natural topology called the compact-open topology. A normal family is a pre-compact subset with respect to this topology.

If Y is a metric space, then the compact-open topology is equivalent to the topology of compact convergence, and we obtain a definition which is closer to the classical one: A collection F of continuous functions is called a normal family if every sequence of functions in F contains a subsequence which converges uniformly on compact subsets of X to a continuous function from X to Y. That is, for every sequence of functions in F, there is a subsequence $f_n(x)$ and a continuous function $f(x)$ from X to Y such that the following holds for every compact subset K contained in X:

$$\lim_{n\rightarrow\infty} \sup_{x\in K} d_Y(f_n(x),f(x)) = 0$$

where $d_Y$ is the metric of Y.

== Normal families of holomorphic functions ==
The concept arose in complex analysis, that is the study of holomorphic functions. In this case, X is an open subset of the complex plane, Y is the complex plane, and the metric on Y is given by $d_Y(y_1,y_2) = |y_1-y_2|$. As a consequence of Cauchy's integral theorem, a sequence of holomorphic functions that converges uniformly on compact sets must converge to a holomorphic function. That is, each limit point of a normal family is holomorphic.

Normal families of holomorphic functions provide the quickest way of proving the Riemann mapping theorem.

More generally, if the spaces X and Y are Riemann surfaces, and Y is equipped with the metric coming from the uniformization theorem, then each limit point of a normal family of holomorphic functions $f: X \to Y$ is also holomorphic.

For example, if Y is the Riemann sphere, then the metric of uniformization is the spherical distance. In this case, a holomorphic function from X to Y is called a meromorphic function, and so each limit point of a normal family of meromorphic functions is a meromorphic function.

== Criteria ==
In the classical context of holomorphic functions, there are several criteria that can be used to establish that a family is normal: Montel's theorem states that a family of locally bounded holomorphic functions is normal. The Montel-Caratheodory theorem states that the family of meromorphic functions that omit three distinct values in the extended complex plane is normal. For a family of holomorphic functions, this reduces to requiring two values omitted by viewing each function as a meromorphic function omitting the value infinity.

Marty's theorem provides a criterion equivalent to normality in the context of meromorphic functions: A family $F$ of meromorphic functions from a domain $U \subset \mathbb{C}$ to the complex plane is a normal family if and only if for each compact subset K of U there exists a constant C so that for each $f \in F$ and each z in K we have

$$\frac{2|f'(z)|}{1 + |f(z)|^2} \leq C.$$

Indeed, the expression on the left is the formula for the pull-back of the arclength element on the Riemann sphere to the complex plane via the inverse of stereographic projection.

== History ==
Paul Montel first coined the term "normal family" in 1911. Because the concept of a normal family has continually been very important to complex analysis, Montel's terminology is still used to this day, even though from a modern perspective, the phrase pre-compact subset might be preferred by some mathematicians. Note that though the notion of compact open topology generalizes and clarifies the concept, in many applications the original definition is more practical.

== See also ==
- Fundamental normality test
