= Paul Montel =

French mathematician

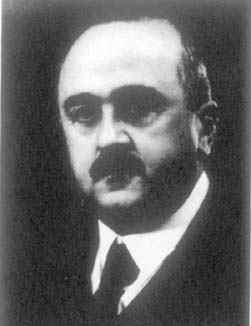
- Born: Paul Antoine Aristide Montel; 29 April 1876; Nice, France
- Died: 22 January 1975 (aged 98); Paris, France
- Education: Sorbonne
- Known for: Montel's theorem Montel space Normal family
- Scientific career
- Fields: Mathematics
- Workplaces: Paris-Sorbonne University; École Normale Supérieure
- Doctoral advisor: Émile Borel
- Doctoral students: Mieczysław Biernacki; Henri Cartan; Jean Dieudonné; Lucien Hibbert; Miron Nicolescu

Paul Antoine Aristide Montel (29 April 1876 – 22 January 1975) was a French mathematician. He was born in Nice, France and died in Paris, France. He researched mostly on holomorphic functions in complex analysis.

Montel was a student of Émile Borel at the Sorbonne. Henri Cartan, Jean Dieudonné and Miron Nicolescu were among his students.

Montel's most important contribution to mathematics was the introduction and systematic development of the notion of normal family. This very influential book also contains the first exposition in the book form of the results of Pierre Fatou and Gaston Julia on holomorphic dynamics. The notion of normal family was a predecessor of the notion of compact space introduced by Pavel Alexandrov and Pavel Urysohn in 1929.

== Bibliography ==
- O'Connor, John J.; Robertson, Edmund F., "Paul Montel", MacTutor History of Mathematics Archive, University of St Andrews
