= Le Patriarche Association =

Le Patriarche
- Industry: Rehabilitation
- Founded: 1974
- Headquarters: France
- Key people: Lucien Engelmajer

Le Patriarche nowadays known as Dianova International is an association created in France in 1974 with the purpose of rehabilitating people who use drugs (PWUD) in a communitarian environment.

== History ==
=== 1970s ===
The association was founded on May 2, 1974, by Lucien Engelmajer, in Saint-Paul-sur-Save, near Toulouse, France. The name of the association is a reference to the founder's surname.

The association Le Patriarche developed a different approach to withdrawal, based on a system free from drugs and substitutes. It also implied a redefinition of social ties. The newcomers were under the supervision of their peers, who had experienced the same problem. The association's motto was "help, to be helped". In the eighties, many centers were opened in Europe and the Americas. In the early nineties, it had more than 5,000 residents in 210 centers, located in 17 countries.

=== 1980s ===
When the AIDS pandemic broke out, the association Le Patriarche was able to provide some care to the HIV-positive, by opening dedicated centres. However, it was unable to evolve and follow the new trends in consumption and treatments, being heavily criticised, mainly for the lack of qualified staff and having a structure based on free workforce.

In 1985, the Swiss section of the association Le Patriarche separated and named a new president; however, the Swiss government seized the centres in its territory and forbid Lucien Engelmajer from entering the country.

=== 1990s ===
In 1995, the association Le Patriarche was signalled by a French governmental report as a sect.

The association's charismatic leader and founder was accused and trialed on charges of embezzlement and violence against residents. In 1998, he was forced to quit by the administration. In the same year, the association was restructured and all references to its past were erased. That same year, pressured by judicial outcomes, le Patriarche rebranded and adopted "the corporate name, Dianova, in order to emphasize its renewal", attempting to separate from its founder.

=== 2000s and 2010s ===
On January 9, 2007, a Toulouse court condemned Lucien Engelmajer, founder of the association «Le Patriarche», for abuse of ignorance or frailty, practice of covert labour, breach of trust, embezzlement, forgery, money laundering, to a sentence of 5 years imprisonment and a fine of 375.000 euros.

Under several arrest warrants, Lucien Engelmajer escaped to Belize, where he came to die in 2007

The association continues its activities under the name Dianova International and was even granted special consultative status by the United Nations Economic and Social Council in 2007.

== Bibliography ==
- Quiet, Peter. In the House of Le Patriarche. CreateSpace Independent Publishing Platform, 2015. (ISBN 978-1511408493)
