= Georges Valiron =

French mathematician (1884–1955)

- Born: Georges Jean Marie Valiron; 7 September 1884; Lyon
- Died: 17 March 1955 (aged 70); Paris
- Education: University of Paris
- Known for: Valiron's theorem
- Awards: Prix Poncelet (1948)
- Scientific career
- Fields: Mathematics
- Workplaces: University of Paris; University of Strasbourg
- Doctoral advisor: Émile Borel
- Doctoral students: Charles Blanc; Paul Germain; Jean Kuntzmann; Laurent Schwartz

Georges Jean Marie Valiron (7 September 1884 – 17 March 1955) was a French mathematician, notable for his contributions to analysis, in particular, the asymptotic behaviour of entire functions of finite order and Tauberian theorems.

== Biography ==
Valiron obtained his Ph.D. from the University of Paris in 1914, under supervision of Émile Borel. Since 1922 he held a professorship at the University of Strasbourg, and since 1931 a chair at the University of Paris. He gave a plenary speech at the 1932 International Congress of Mathematicians in Zürich and was an invited speaker of the ICM in 1920 in Strasbourg and in 1928 in Bologna. His treatise on mathematical analysis in two volumes (Théorie des fonctions and Équations fonctionnelles) is a classic and has been translated into numerous languages under diverse titles and has gone through many new editions, both French and non-French.

He was awarded the title Commander of the Legion of Honour in 1954. One of Valiron's doctoral students, Laurent Schwartz, went on to receive a Fields Medal in 1950.

== Publications ==
- Sur les fonctions entières d'ordre nul et d'ordre fini, et en particulier sur les fonctions à correspondance régulière, thesis presented on 20 June 1914 to Valiron's thesis committee
- Lectures on the general theory of integral functions, translated into English by Edward Collingwood, preface by William Henry Young, 1923.
- Fonctions entières et fonctions méromorphes, Mémorial des sciences mathématiques 2, 1925.
- Théorie générale des séries de Dirichlet, Mémorial des sciences mathématiques 17, 1926.
- Familles normales et quasi-normales de fonctions méromorphes, Mémorial des sciences mathématiques 38, 1929.
- Fonctions convexes et fonctions entières, bulletin de la SMF, 1932.
- Sur les valeurs exceptionnelles des fonctions méromorphes et de leurs dérivées, 1937
- with Paul Appell: Analyse mathématique, 2 vols. 1938.
- Direction de Borel des fonctions méromorphes, Mémorial des sciences mathématiques 89, 1938.
- Cours d’analyse mathématiques. Masson 1942, 1945 (consisting of 2 vols.: Théorie des fonctions. 1942, Équations fonctionelles et applications. 1945, 2nd edn. 1950), Reprint by Masson 1966 and by the edition Jacques Gabay 1989
- Fonctions analytiques, 1954.
- Fonctions entières d'ordre fini et fonctions méromorphes, l'enseignement mathématique, 1960 (1st edn. 1948).
- The geometric theory of ordinary differential equations. Brookline, Massachusetts, 1984 (English trans. Cours d'analyse mathematiques)
- Classical differential geometry of curves and surfaces. Brookline, 1986

== See also ==
Wiman-Valiron theory
