= Lasse Rempe =

German mathematician (born 1978)

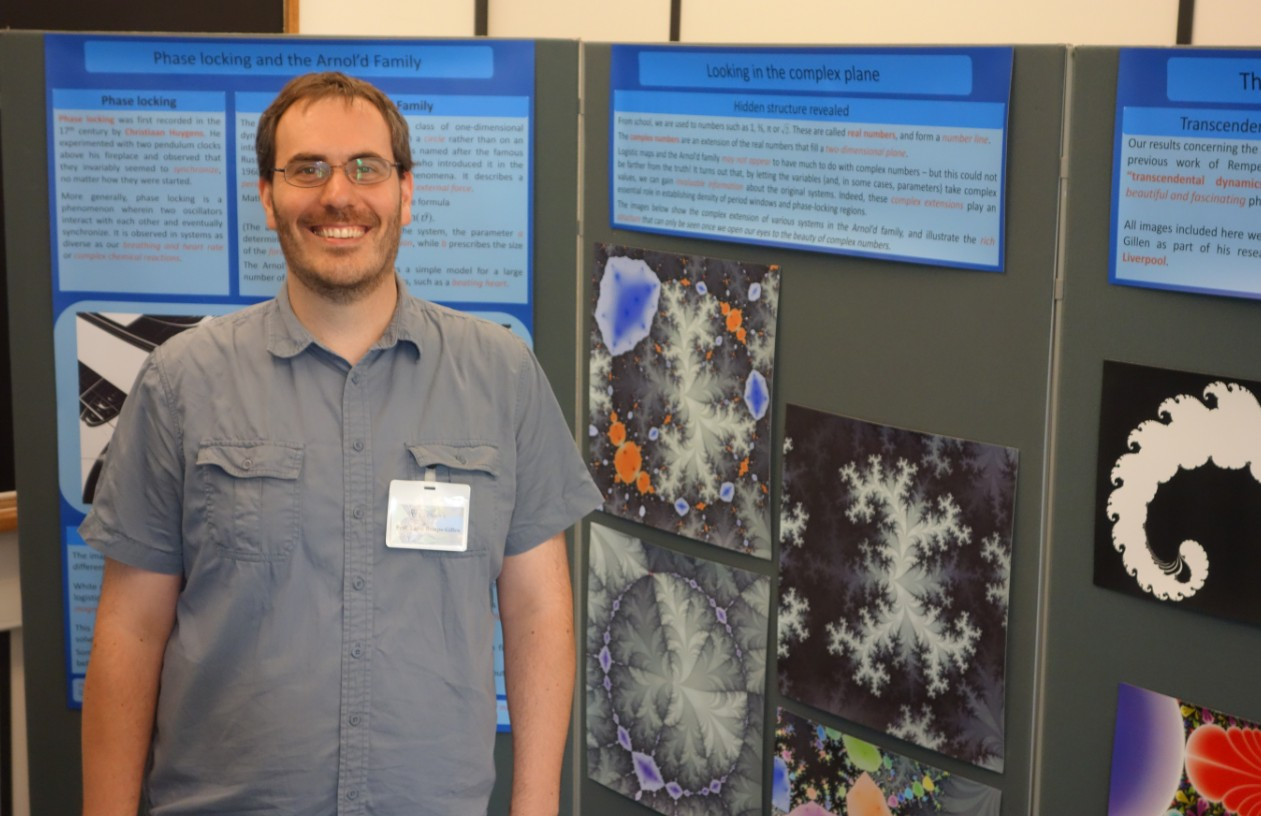
- Born: 20 January 1978 (age 48); Kiel, West Germany
- Education: State University of New York; Christian-Albrechts-Universität
- Awards: Whitehead Prize (2010)
- Scientific career
- Fields: Mathematics
- Workplaces: University of Manchester; University of Liverpool; University of Warwick; Université Paris-Sud
- Doctoral advisor: Walter Bergweiler

Lasse Rempe (born 20 January 1978) is a German mathematician born in Kiel. His research interests include holomorphic dynamics and function theory. He currently holds the position of Professor of Pure Mathematics at the Department of Mathematics, University of Manchester. He previously worked at the University of Liverpool from 2006 to 2024, holding the "Shipowners' Chair" of Pure Mathematics from 2020 to 2024. Rempe recorded the voiceover for a BBC feature on the art of mathematics, where he explained how certain pictures have arisen from dynamical systems.

== Name ==
From 2012 to 2020, he used the name Lasse Rempe-Gillen.

== Early life and education ==
Rempe earned his Master of Arts degree in mathematics from State University of New York at Stony Brook in 2000 and his doctorate at the University of Kiel in Germany.

== Awards ==
In June 2010, Rempe was awarded a Whitehead Prize by the London Mathematical Society for his work in complex dynamics, in particular his research on the escaping set for entire functions.

In 2012 he was awarded a Philip Leverhulme Prize.

He was elected as a member of the 2017 class of Fellows of the American Mathematical Society "for contributions to complex dynamics and function theory, and for communication of mathematical research to broader audiences".

== Images ==
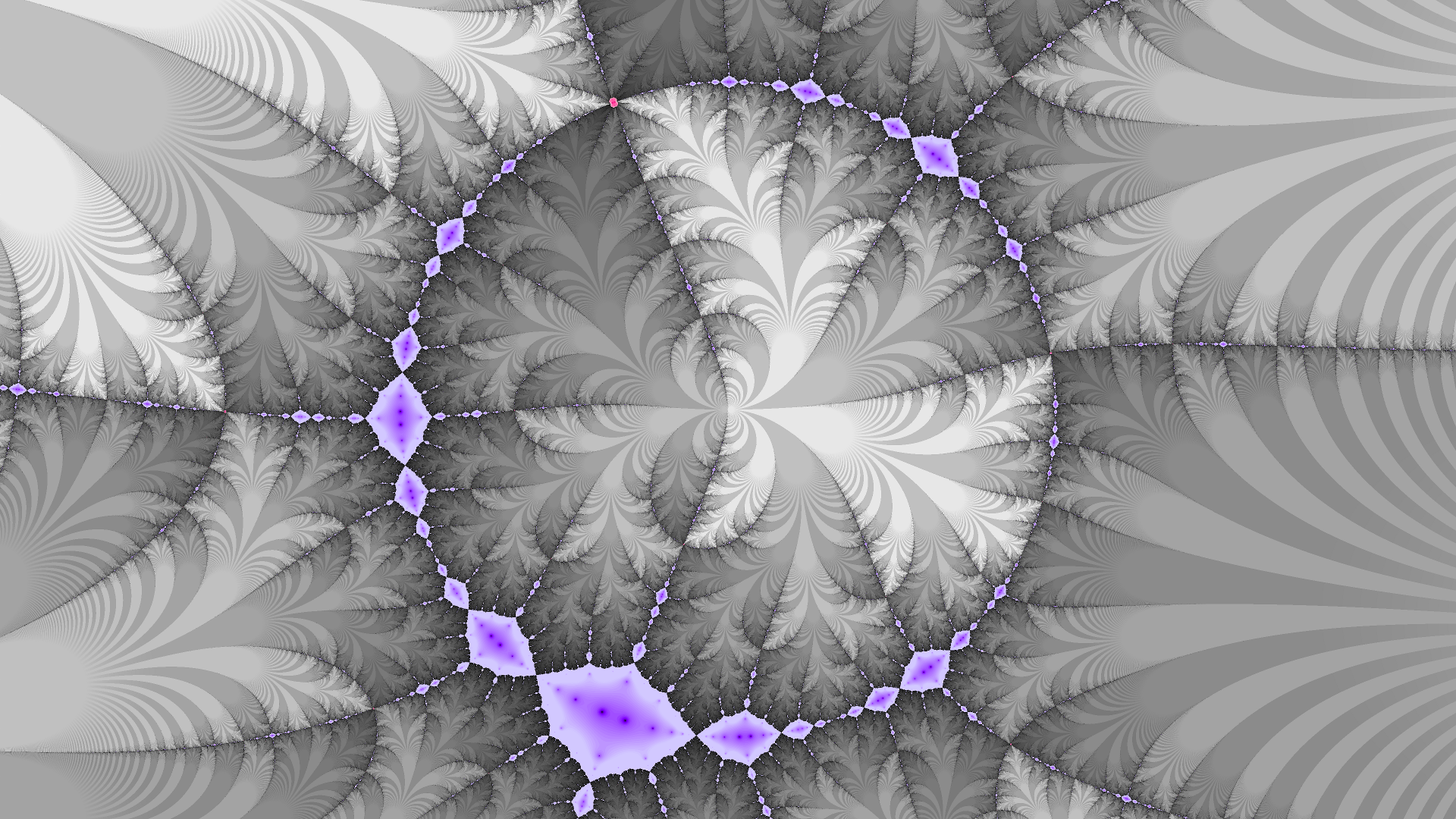
The dynamical plane of (the complexification of) the circle map, the simplest mathematical model of phase-locking phenomena.

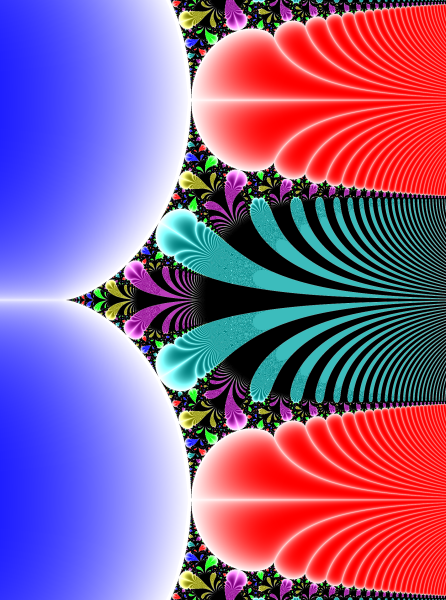
This is a plot of parameter space for the complex exponential family, ƒ(z) = exp(z) + c.
