= Henri Baruk =

French neuropsychiatrist (1897–1999)

Henri Baruk (August 15, 1897 in Saint-Avé, Morbihan – June 14, 1999 in Saint-Maurice, Val-de-Marne) was a French neuropsychiatrist. He advocated for moral treatment.

Baruk was of Jewish descent. He spent his childhood among patients at the Lesvellec asylum where his father, Jacques Baruk, was the chief doctor. Baruk served in World War I and was awarded the Croix de guerre.
