= Bloch's theorem (complex analysis) =

Mathematical theorem

In complex analysis, a branch of mathematics, Bloch's theorem describes the behaviour of holomorphic functions defined on the unit disk. It gives a lower bound on the size of a disk in which an inverse to a holomorphic function exists. It is named after André Bloch.

== Statement ==
Let f be a holomorphic function in the unit disk |z| ≤ 1 for which

$$|f'(0)|=1$$

Bloch's theorem states that there is a disk S ⊂ D on which f is biholomorphic and f(S) contains a disk with radius 1/72.

== Landau's theorem ==
If f is a holomorphic function in the unit disk with the property |f′(0)| = 1, then let L_{f} be the radius of the largest disk contained in the image of f.

Landau's theorem states that there is a constant L defined as the infimum of L_{f} over all such functions f, and that L is greater than Bloch's constant L ≥ B.

This theorem is named after Edmund Landau.

== Valiron's theorem ==
Bloch's theorem was inspired by the following theorem of Georges Valiron:

Theorem. If f is a non-constant entire function then there exist disks D of arbitrarily large radius and analytic functions φ in D such that f(φ(z)) = z for z in D.

Bloch's theorem corresponds to Valiron's theorem via the Bloch's principle.

== Proof ==
=== Landau's theorem ===
We first prove the case when f(0) = 0, f′(0) = 1, and |f′(z)| ≤ 2 in the unit disk.

By Cauchy's integral formula, we have a bound

$$|f''(z)|=\left|\frac{1}{2\pi i}\oint_\gamma\frac{f'(w)}{(w-z)^2}\,\mathrm{d}w\right|\le\frac{1}{2\pi}\cdot2\pi r\sup_{w=\gamma(t)}\frac{|f'(w)|}{|w-z|^2}\le\frac{2}{r},$$

where γ is the counterclockwise circle of radius r around z, and 0 < r < 1 − |z|.

By Taylor's theorem, for each z in the unit disk, there exists 0 ≤ t ≤ 1 such that f(z) = z + z^{2}f″(tz) / 2.

Thus, if |z| = 1/3 and |w| < 1/6, we have

$$|(f(z)-w)-(z-w)|=\frac12|z|^2|f''(tz)|\le\frac{|z|^2}{1-t|z|}\le\frac{|z|^2}{1-|z|}=\frac16<|z|-|w|\le|z-w|.$$

By Rouché's theorem, the range of f contains the disk of radius 1/6 around 0.

Let D(z_{0}, r) denote the open disk of radius r around z_{0}. For an analytic function g : D(z_{0}, r) → C such that g(z_{0}) ≠ 0, the case above applied to (g(z_{0} + rz) − g(z_{0})) / (rg′(0)) implies that the range of g contains D(g(z_{0}), |g′(0)|r / 6).

For the general case, let f be an analytic function in the unit disk such that |f′(0)| = 1, and z_{0} = 0.

- If |f′(z)| ≤ 2|f′(z_{0})| for |z − z_{0}| < 1/4, then by the first case, the range of f contains a disk of radius |f′(z_{0})| / 24 = 1/24.
- Otherwise, there exists z_{1} such that |z_{1} − z_{0}| < 1/4 and |f′(z_{1})| > 2|f′(z_{0})|.
- If |f′(z)| ≤ 2|f′(z_{1})| for |z − z_{1}| < 1/8, then by the first case, the range of f contains a disk of radius |f′(z_{1})| / 48 > |f′(z_{0})| / 24 = 1/24.
- Otherwise, there exists z_{2} such that |z_{2} − z_{1}| < 1/8 and |f′(z_{2})| > 2|f′(z_{1})|.

Repeating this argument, we either find a disk of radius at least 1/24 in the range of f, proving the theorem, or find an infinite sequence (z_{n}) such that |z_{n} − z_{n−1}| < 1/2^{n+1} and |f′(z_{n})| > 2|f′(z_{n−1})|.

In the latter case the sequence is in D(0, 1/2), so f′ is unbounded in D(0, 1/2), a contradiction.

=== Bloch's theorem ===
In the proof of Landau's Theorem above, Rouché's theorem implies that not only can we find a disk D of radius at least 1/24 in the range of f, but there is also a small disk D_{0} inside the unit disk such that for every w ∈ D there is a unique z ∈ D_{0} with f(z) = w. Thus, f is a bijective analytic function from D_{0} ∩ f^{−1}(D) to D, so its inverse φ is also analytic by the inverse function theorem.

== Bloch's and Landau's constants ==
The number B is called Bloch's constant. The lower bound 1/72 in Bloch's theorem is not the best possible. Bloch's theorem tells us B ≥ 1/72, but the exact value of B is still unknown.

The best known bounds for B at present are

$$0.4332\approx\frac{\sqrt{3}}{4}+2\times10^{-4}\leq B\leq \sqrt{\frac{\sqrt{3}-1}{2}} \cdot \frac{\Gamma(\frac{1}{3})\Gamma(\frac{11}{12})}{\Gamma(\frac{1}{4})}\approx 0.47186,$$

where Γ is the Gamma function. The lower bound was proved by Chen and Gauthier, and the upper bound dates back to Ahlfors and Grunsky.

The similarly defined optimal constant L in Landau's theorem is called Landau's constant. Its exact value is also unknown, but it is known that

$0.5 < L \le \frac{\Gamma(\frac{1}{3})\Gamma(\frac{5}{6})}{\Gamma(\frac{1}{6})} = 0.543258965342... \,\!$ (sequence A081760 in the OEIS)

In their paper, Ahlfors and Grunsky conjectured that their upper bounds are actually the true values of B and L.

For injective holomorphic functions on the unit disk, a constant A can similarly be defined. It is known that

$$0.5 < A \le 0.7853$$

== See also ==
- Table of selected mathematical constants
