= Frank Nielsen =

Frank Nielsen may refer to:

- Frank Nielsen (Australian footballer)
- Frank Nielsen (Danish footballer)
- Frank Nielsen (computer scientist)
