= János Pach =

Hungarian mathematician

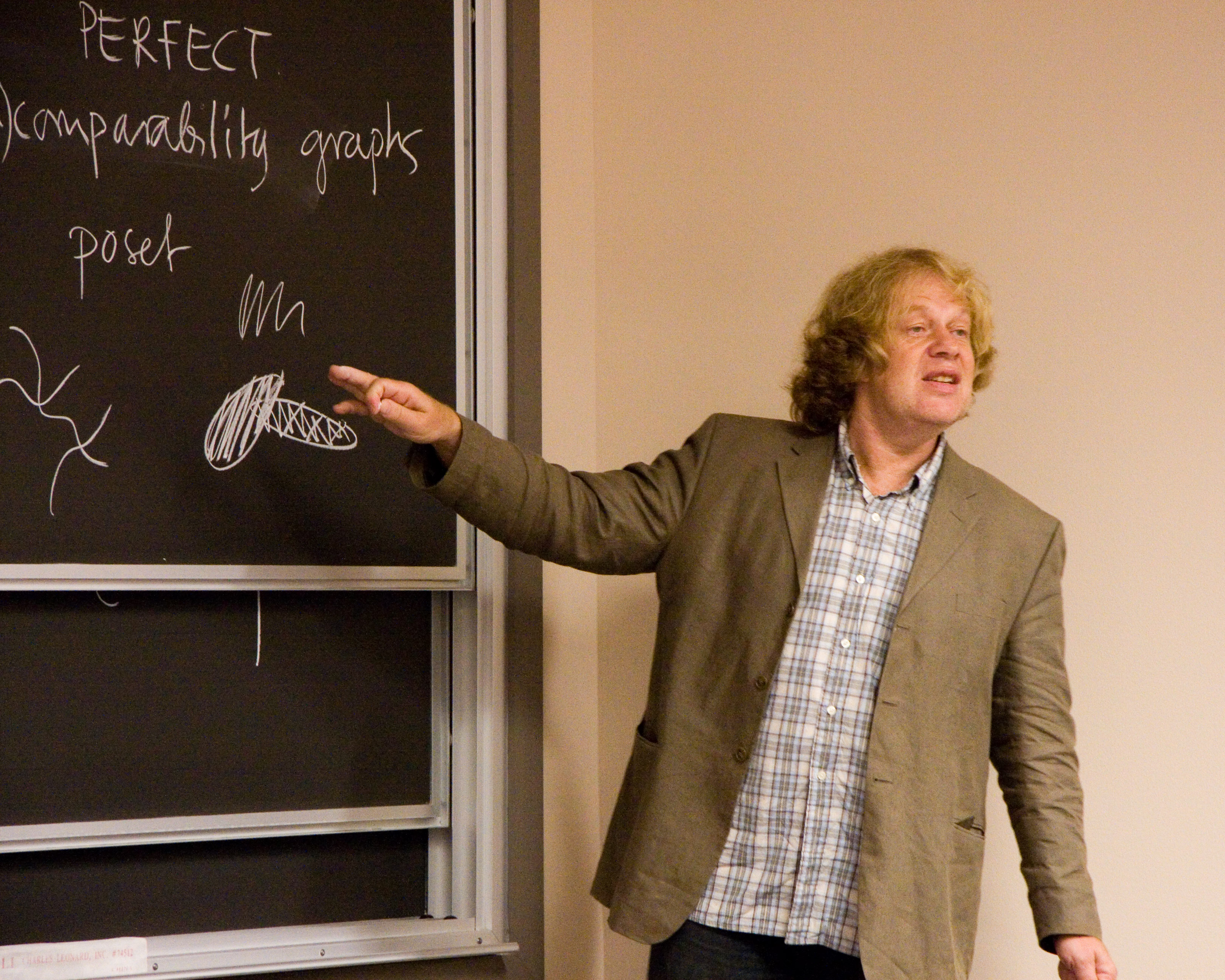
- János Pach at Graph Drawing 2009
- Born: May 3, 1954 (age 72); Hungary
- Education: Eötvös Loránd University, Hungary, (M.S., Math., 1977; Ph.D., Math., 1981); Hungarian Academy of Sciences, (Candidate, 1983; Doctorate, 1995)
- Occupations: professor and mathematician
- Known for: combinatorics and computational geometry
- Website: Rényi Institute of Mathematics

János Pach (born May 3, 1954) is a mathematician and computer scientist working in the fields of combinatorics and discrete and computational geometry.

== Biography ==
Pach was born and grew up in Hungary. He comes from a noted academic family: his father, Zsigmond Pál Pach (1919–2001) was a well-known historian, and his mother Klára (née Sós, 1925–2020) was a university mathematics teacher; his maternal aunt Vera T. Sós and her husband Pál Turán are two of the best-known Hungarian mathematicians.

Pach received his Candidate degree from the Hungarian Academy of Sciences, in 1983, where his advisor was Miklós Simonovits.

Since 1977, he has been affiliated with the Alfréd Rényi Institute of Mathematics of the Hungarian Academy of Sciences.

He was Research Professor at the Courant Institute of Mathematical Sciences at New York University (since 1986), Distinguished Professor of Computer Science at the City College of New York (1992-2011), and Neilson Professor at Smith College (2008-2009).

Between 2008 and 2019, he was Professor of the Chair of Combinatorial Geometry at École Polytechnique Fédérale de Lausanne.

He was the program chair for the International Symposium on Graph Drawing in 2004 and Symposium on Computational Geometry in 2015. He is co-editor-in-chief of the journal Discrete and Computational Geometry, and he serves on the editorial boards of several other journals including Combinatorica, SIAM Journal on Discrete Mathematics, Computational Geometry, Graphs and Combinatorics, Central European Journal of Mathematics, and Moscow Journal of Combinatorics and Number Theory.

He was an invited speaker at the Combinatorics session of the International Congress of Mathematicians, in Seoul, 2014. He was a plenary speaker at the European Congress of Mathematics (Portorož), 2021.

== Research ==
Pach has authored several books and over 300 research papers. He was one of the most frequent collaborators of Paul Erdős, authoring over 20 papers with him and thus has an Erdős number of one.

Pach's research is focused in the areas of combinatorics and discrete geometry. In 1981, he solved Ulam's problem, showing that there exists no universal planar graph. In the early 90s together with Micha Perles, he initiated the systematic study of extremal problems on topological and geometric graphs.

Some of Pach's most-cited research work concerns the combinatorial complexity of families of curves in the plane and their applications to motion planning problems the maximum number of k-sets and halving lines that a planar point set may have, crossing numbers of graphs, embedding of planar graphs onto fixed sets of points, and lower bounds for epsilon-nets.

== Awards and honors ==
Pach received the Grünwald Medal of the János Bolyai Mathematical Society (1982), the Lester R. Ford Award from the Mathematical Association of America (1990), and the Alfréd Rényi Prize from the Hungarian Academy of Sciences (1992). He was an Erdős Lecturer at Hebrew University of Jerusalem in 2005. In 2011 he was listed as a fellow of the Association for Computing Machinery for his research in computational geometry. In 2014 he was elected as a member of Academia Europaea, and in 2015 as a fellow of the American Mathematical Society "for contributions to discrete and combinatorial geometry and to convexity and combinatorics." In 2022 he was elected corresponding member of the Hungarian Academy of Sciences.

== Books ==
- Pach, János, ed. (1993), New Trends in Discrete and Computational Geometry, Algorithms and Combinatorics, vol. 10, Springer-Verlag, ISBN 978-3-540-55713-5.
- Pach, János; Agarwal, Pankaj K. (1995), Combinatorial Geometry, Wiley-Interscience Series in Discrete Mathematics and Optimization, John Wiley & Sons, ISBN 978-0-471-58890-0.
- Aronov, Boris; Basu, Saugata; Pach, János; et al., eds. (2003), Discrete and Computational Geometry: The Goodman–Pollack Festschrift, Algorithms and Combinatorics, vol. 25, Springer-Verlag, ISBN 978-3-540-00371-7.
- Pach, János, ed. (2004), Towards a Theory of Geometric Graphs, Contemporary Mathematics, vol. 342, American Mathematical Society, ISBN 978-0-8218-3484-8.
- Pach, János, ed. (2004), Graph Drawing: 12th International Symposium, GD 2004, New York, NY, USA, September 29-October 2, 2004, Lecture Notes in Computer Science, vol. 3383, Springer-Verlag, ISBN 978-3-540-24528-5.
- Brass, Peter; Moser, W. O. J.; Pach, János, eds. (2005), Research Problems in Discrete Geometry, Springer-Verlag, ISBN 978-0-387-23815-9.
- Goodman, Jacob E.; Pach, János; Emo, Welzl, eds. (2005), Combinatorial and Computational Geometry, MSRI Publications, vol. 52, Cambridge University Press, ISBN 978-0-521-84862-6.
- Goodman, Jacob E.; Pach, János; Pollack, Richard, eds. (2008), Surveys on Discrete and Computational Geometry: Twenty Years Later, Contemporary Mathematics, vol. 453, American Mathematical Society, ISBN 978-0-8218-4239-3.
- Pach, János; Sharir, Micha (2009), Combinatorial Geometry and Its Algorithmic Applications: The Alcalá Lectures, Mathematical Surveys and Monographs, American Mathematical Society, ISBN 978-0-8218-4691-9.
- Pach, János, ed. (2013), Thirty essays on geometric graph theory, Springer, ISBN 978-1-4614-0110-0.

== See also ==
- Mountain climbing problem
