= Michael Segal =

Israeli academic (born 1972)

- מיכאל סגל
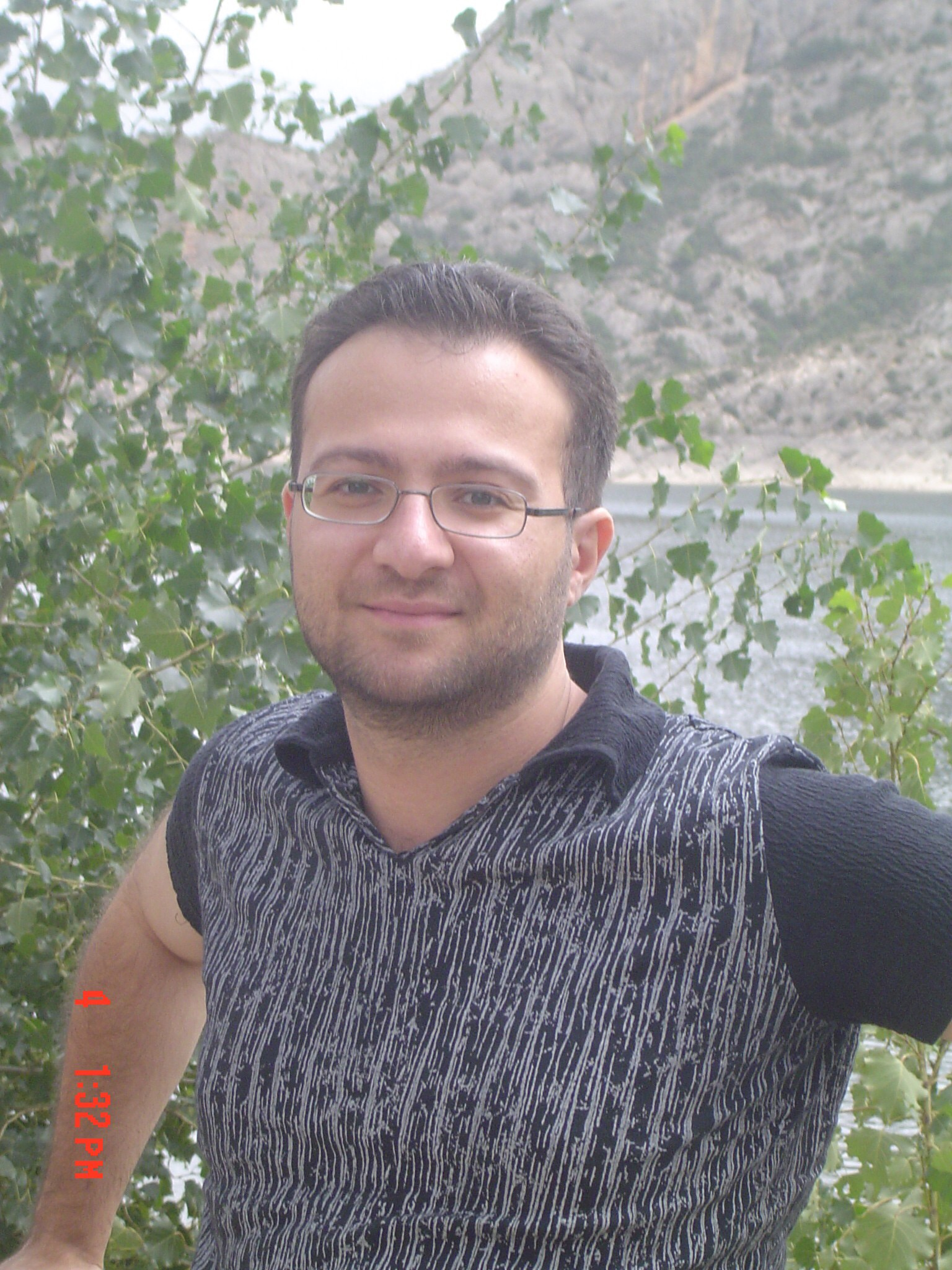
- Segal in 2007
- Born: 1972 (age 53–54); Chișinău, Soviet Union
- Education: Ben-Gurion University of the Negev
- Known for: Works in Wireless ad hoc networks Wireless Sensor Networks
- Awards: Toronto Prize (2010)
- Scientific career
- Fields: Computer Science
- Thesis: Covering point sets and accompanying problems (2000)
- Doctoral advisor: Klara Kedem

Michael Segal (Hebrew: מיכאל סגל; Russian: Михаил Сегал; born 1972 in Kishinev, USSR) is a professor of Communication Systems Engineering at Ben-Gurion University of the Negev, known for his work in ad-hoc and sensor networks.

== Career ==
After completing his undergraduate studies at Ben-Gurion University in 1994, Segal received a Ph.D. in Mathematics and Computer Science from Ben-Gurion University in 2000 under the supervision of Klara Kedem. The topic of his PhD Dissertation was: Covering point sets and accompanying problems.

After continuing his studies with David G. Kirkpatrick at University of British Columbia, and Pacific Institute for the Mathematical Studies he joined the faculty at Ben-Gurion University in 2000, where he also served as the head of the Communication Systems Engineering department between 2005 and 2010. He is known (equally with his coauthors) for being first to analyze the analytical performance of the well-known Least Cluster Change (LCC) algorithm that is widely used in ad hoc networks for re-clustering in order to reduce the number of modifications. He also was one of the first to introduce and analyze the construction of multi-criteria spanners for ad hoc networks.

Segal has published over 200 scientific papers and was a recipient of the Toronto Prize for Research in 2010. He is serving as the Editor-in-Chief for the Journal of Computer and System Sciences. Currently he is heading the Engineering program studies in Eilat campus at Ben-Gurion University of the Negev. He has served several times as a head of the University Regulations Committee and Disciplinary court. Along with his Ben-Gurion University professorship, he held visiting professor positions at Cambridge University, University of Liverpool and Lancaster University. Segal is the member of the Committee for Information and Communication Technology Standards of Standards Institute of Israel.
