= Otfried Cheong =

German-Korean computer scientist

Otfried Cheong (Korean: 오트프리드 정; formerly Otfried Schwarzkopf) is a German computational geometer working in South Korea at KAIST. He is known as one of the authors of the widely used computational geometry textbook Computational Geometry: Algorithms and Applications (with Mark de Berg, Marc van Kreveld, and Mark Overmars) and as the developer of Ipe, a vector graphics editor.

== Education ==
Cheong completed his doctorate from the Free University of Berlin in 1992 under the supervision of Helmut Alt.

== Career ==
He joined KAIST in 2005, after previously holding positions at Utrecht University, Pohang University of Science and Technology, Hong Kong University of Science and Technology, and the Eindhoven University of Technology. Cheong was co-chair of the Symposium on Computational Geometry in 2006, with Nina Amenta.

== Awards and honors ==
In 2017, he was recognized by the Association for Computing Machinery as an ACM Distinguished Member.
