= Journal of Computational Geometry =

- Discipline: Computational geometry
- Language: English
- Edited by: Kenneth L. Clarkson, Günter Rote

Publication details
- History: 2010–present
- Publisher: MacOdrum Library, Carleton University
- Open access: Yes
- License: Creative Commons Attribution 3.0

Standard abbreviations
- ISO 4: J. Comput. Geom.

Indexing
- ISSN: 1920-180X
- OCLC no.: 610474557

Links
- Journal homepage; Online access; Online archive

The Journal of Computational Geometry (JoCG) is an open access mathematics journal that was established in 2010. It covers research in all aspects of computational geometry. All its papers are published free of charge to both authors and readers, and are made freely available through a Creative Commons Attribution license. The current editors-in-chief are Kenneth L. Clarkson and Günter Rote.

Along with its regularly contributed papers, the journal has since 2014 invited selected papers from the annual Symposium on Computational Geometry to a special issue.

== Abstracting and indexing ==
The Journal of Computational Geometry is abstracted and indexed in MathSciNet, Zentralblatt Math, and the Emerging Sources Citation Index. Long-term preservation of journal contents are ensured by the journal's membership in the Global LOCKSS Network.
