= Nina Amenta =

American computer scientist

- Born: Annamaria Beatrice Amenta; 1958 or 1959 (age 67–68)
- Education: Yale University; University of California, Berkeley
- Known for: Surface reconstruction, 3D shape modeling, computational geometry
- Awards: Sloan Research Fellowship; UC Davis Chancellor's Fellowship; Computational Geometry: Theory and Applications Test of Time Award
- Scientific career
- Fields: Computer science, computational geometry, computer graphics, visualization
- Institutions: The Geometry Center; Xerox PARC; University of Texas at Austin; University of California, Davis
- Thesis: Helly Theorems and Generalized Linear Programming (1994)
- Doctoral advisor: Raimund Seidel
- Website: web.cs.ucdavis.edu/~amenta/

Annamaria Beatrice "Nina" Amenta (born 1958 or 1959) is an American computer scientist and professor emeritus of computer science at the University of California, Davis. Her research is in computational geometry, computer graphics, and visualization, especially algorithms for collecting, processing, reconstructing, and visualizing three-dimensional shapes.

== Education and career ==
Amenta grew up in Pittsburgh, where as a high-school student in the 1970s she explored mathematical patterns inspired by M. C. Escher and used Carnegie Mellon University library books to learn about repeating patterns. She studied classical civilization at Yale University, graduating in 1979. After working for more than ten years as a computer programmer, including five years writing firmware for medical ultrasound machines, she returned to graduate study through the University of California, Berkeley Reentry Program.

She received her Ph.D. from the University of California, Berkeley in 1994. Her dissertation, Helly Theorems and Generalized Linear Programming, was supervised by Raimund Seidel.

After postdoctoral work at The Geometry Center and Xerox PARC, Amenta joined the faculty of the University of Texas at Austin. She moved to the University of California, Davis in 2002. In late 2011, Amenta became director of CITRIS at UC Davis, where she worked to connect information technology researchers with interdisciplinary projects in climate, health, visualization, and public-interest technology.

At UC Davis, she served as vice-chair of the Department of Computer Science from 2007 to 2012 and chair from 2013 to 2017. She was later named professor emeritus.

During graduate school at Berkeley, Amenta wrote Kali, a program for creating tessellations in the 17 wallpaper groups; it was later modified and developed by topologist Jeff Weeks.

Amenta co-chaired the 2006 Symposium on Computational Geometry with Otfried Cheong.

== Research ==
Amenta is known for her work on surface reconstruction from scattered data points. Tamal K. Dey's book Curve and Surface Reconstruction describes work by Amenta and Marshall Bern as the first surface reconstruction algorithm with proved guarantees.

Her later work has included point-set surfaces, geometric algorithms for three-dimensional modeling, forest LiDAR visualization, biological shape analysis, applications in graphics and visualization, and GPU-based algorithms for geometric computation.

Amenta has collaborated with physical anthropologist Eric Delson on modeling gradual evolutionary change in primate skull morphology, using laser-scanned skulls and evolutionary trees based on genomic data.

In 2020, Amenta, Sunghee Choi, and Ravi Kolluri received a Test of Time Award from the journal Computational Geometry: Theory and Applications for their 2001 paper "The power crust, unions of balls, and the medial axis transform". UC Davis described the paper as having provided a conceptual framework that researchers in computational geometry continued to use nearly two decades later.

== Awards and honors ==
- Alfred P. Sloan Foundation Research Fellowship
- UC Davis Chancellor's Fellowship
- Computational Geometry: Theory and Applications Test of Time Award, 2020
- UC Davis College of Engineering Outstanding Faculty Award for Excellence in Teaching, 2021

== Selected publications ==
- Amenta, Nina (1994). "Helly theorems and generalized linear programming". Discrete & Computational Geometry. 12 (3): 241–261.
- Amenta, Nina; Bern, Marshall; Eppstein, David (1998). "The crust and the beta-skeleton: combinatorial curve reconstruction". Graphical Models and Image Processing. 60 (2): 125–135.
- Amenta, Nina; Bern, Marshall (1999). "Surface reconstruction by Voronoi filtering". Discrete & Computational Geometry. 22: 481–504.
- Amenta, Nina; Choi, Sunghee; Kolluri, Ravi (2001). "The power crust, unions of balls, and the medial axis transform". Computational Geometry: Theory and Applications. 19 (2–3): 127–153.
- Amenta, Nina; Choi, Sunghee; Dey, Tamal K.; Leekha, Naveen (2000). "A simple algorithm for homeomorphic surface reconstruction". Proceedings of the Sixteenth Annual Symposium on Computational Geometry. Association for Computing Machinery. pp. 213–222.
- Amenta, Nina; Attali, Dominique; Devillers, Olivier (2012). "A tight bound for the Delaunay triangulation of points on a polyhedron". Discrete & Computational Geometry. 48 (1): 19–38.
- Tsui, Alex; Fenton, Devin; Vuong, Phong; Hass, Joel; Koehl, Patrice; Amenta, Nina; Coeurjolly, David; DeCarli, Charles; Carmichael, Owen (2013). "Globally optimal cortical surface matching with exact landmark correspondence". Information Processing in Medical Imaging: 487–498.
