= Klara Kedem =

Israeli computer scientist

- קלרה קדם
- Education: Tel Aviv University
- Known for: Computational geometry, shape comparison, motion planning, Voronoi diagrams
- Scientific career
- Fields: Computer Science
- Workplaces: Ben-Gurion University of the Negev, Cornell University
- Doctoral advisor: Micha Sharir

Klara Kedem (Hebrew: קלרה קדם) is an Israeli computer scientist, a professor of computer science at Ben-Gurion University in Beer-Sheva, Israel and an adjunct faculty member in computer science at Cornell University in Ithaca, New York.

Kedem received her Ph.D. in 1989 from Tel Aviv University, under the supervision of Micha Sharir. Her most well-cited research publications are in computational geometry, and concern problems of shape comparison,^{[ACH]} motion planning,^{[KLP]} and Voronoi diagrams.^{[HKS]} She has also collaborated with philosophers and linguists on a project to decipher handwritten medieval Hebrew writings that had been overwritten in Arabic.

== Selected publications ==
HKS.	Huttenlocher, Daniel P.; Kedem, Klara; Sharir, Micha (1993), "The upper envelope of Voronoĭ surfaces and its applications", Discrete & Computational Geometry, 9 (3): 267–291, doi:10.1007/BF02189323, MR 1204784, Zbl 0770.68111, EuDML 131248

ACH.	Arkin, Esther M.; Chew, L. Paul; Huttenlocher, Daniel P.; Kedem, Klara; Mitchell, Joseph S. B. (1991), "An Efficiently Computable Metric for Comparing Polygonal Shapes" (PDF), IEEE Trans. Pattern Anal. Mach. Intell., 13 (3): 209–216, Bibcode:1991ITPAM..13..209A, doi:10.1109/34.75509, hdl:1813/8729, S2CID 8247618, Zbl 0800.68949, archived from the original (PDF) on August 16, 2017

KLP.	Kedem, Klara; Livné, Ron; Pach, János; Sharir, Micha (1986), "On the union of Jordan regions and collision-free translational motion amidst polygonal obstacles", Discrete & Computational Geometry, 1 (1): 59–71, doi:10.1007/BF02187683, MR 0824108, Zbl 0594.52004, EuDML 130981
