= Monique Teillaud =

French researcher

- Born: 14 June 1961 (age 65); Paris
- Education: École normale supérieure de jeunes filles
- Scientific career
- Fields: Computer science
- Workplaces: Inria, École nationale supérieure d'informatique pour l'industrie et l'entreprise
- Doctoral advisor: Jean-Daniel Boissonnat

Monique Teillaud is a French researcher in computational geometry at the French Institute for Research in Computer Science and Automation (INRIA) in Nancy, France. She moved to Nancy in 2014 from a different INRIA center in Sophia Antipolis, where she was one of the developers of CGAL, a software library of computational geometry algorithms.

Teillaud graduated from the École Normale Supérieure de Jeunes Filles in 1985, she then got a position at École nationale supérieure d'informatique pour l'industrie et l'entreprise before moving to Inria in 1989. She completed her Ph.D. in 1991 at Paris-Sud University under the supervision of Jean-Daniel Boissonnat. She was the 2008 program chair of the Symposium on Computational Geometry. She is also the author or editor of two books in computational geometry:

- Towards Dynamic Randomized Algorithms in Computational Geometry (Lecture Notes in Computer Science 758, Springer, 1993)
- Effective Computational Geometry for Curves and Surfaces (edited with Boissonat, Springer, 2007)
