= Lisa the Iconoclast =

- The Simpsons episode
- Episode no.: Season 7 Episode 16
- Directed by: Mike B. Anderson
- Written by: Jonathan Collier
- Production code: 3F13
- Original air date: February 18, 1996

Guest appearances
- Donald Sutherland as Hollis Hurlbut; Phil Hartman as Troy McClure

Episode features
- Couch gag: The family is portrayed as The Brady Bunch.
- Commentary: Bill Oakley; Josh Weinstein; Jonathan Collier; Yeardley Smith; Mike B. Anderson; David Silverman

Episode chronology
← Previous "Bart the Fink"	Next → "Homer the Smithers"
- The Simpsons season 7

"Lisa the Iconoclast" is the sixteenth episode of the seventh season of the American animated television series The Simpsons. It originally aired on Fox in the United States on February 18, 1996. In this episode, Lisa writes an essay on Springfield founder Jebediah Springfield for the town's bicentennial. While doing research, she learns he was a murderous pirate who viewed the town's citizens with contempt. Lisa and Homer try to reveal the truth about Jebediah but only anger Springfield's residents. It was originally advertised in commercials as a Presidents' Day special episode; the episode aired the day before Presidents' Day.

The episode was written by Jonathan Collier and directed by Mike B. Anderson. It was Anderson's first directing role and the story was inspired by the 1991 exhumation of President Zachary Taylor. Donald Sutherland guest-starred as the voice of Hollis Hurlbut, a part that was written specifically for him.

The episode features two neologisms, embiggen and cromulent. Embiggen, coined by Dan Greaney, has since been used in several scientific publications, while cromulent, coined by David X. Cohen, appeared in Dictionary.com's 21st Century Lexicon. In 2018, "cromulent" was added to the Oxford English Dictionary.

== Plot ==
As Springfield celebrates its bicentennial, Miss Hoover assigns Lisa's second-grade class to write an essay on Jebediah Springfield, the town's founder. Meanwhile, Mayor Quimby proclaims Homer the town crier during tryouts for historical figures in the town's upcoming celebration. Because his "criering" is better than Ned Flanders', Homer seizes Ned's heirloom hat and bell as props, damaging the hat in the process.

Lisa visits the town's historical society to research Jebediah's life. Hollis Hurlbut, the society's curator, appreciates Lisa's enthusiasm and grants her access to Jebediah's possessions. While examining his fife, she finds a document inside that purports to be a confession of his secret past as the vicious pirate Hans Sprungfeld, as he was known until 1796. He had attempted to kill George Washington while the latter was having his portrait painted, and later wrote and hid his confession, confident that no one in Springfield would ever find it.

Lisa tries to convince the townspeople of the truth about Jebediah, but is met with disbelief and hostility. Hurlbut dismisses the confession as a forgery, and Miss Hoover gives Lisa a failing grade for writing her essay about it, accusing her of political correctness. Continuing her research, Lisa discovers that Jebediah wore a prosthetic silver tongue after his own was bitten off in a fight. She persuades local government officials to exhume his remains and search for it, but there is no sign of it when the coffin is opened. Exasperated at Lisa's meddling, Quimby strips Homer of his position as town crier.

Seeing a copy of the unfinished Washington portrait in her classroom, and remembering a dream in which he urged her to find the "one piece left in the puzzle", Lisa realizes how she can establish the confession as authentic. She returns to the museum and matches its torn edge to that of the portrait, proving that Jebediah had written it on a scrap of the canvas that got caught on his boot when he escaped after failing to kill Washington. The missing silver tongue is found in one of the museum's exhibits, stolen from the coffin by Hurlbut in an effort to protect his own career and the legend of Jebediah. Lisa and Hurlbut decide to reveal the truth about him during a parade celebrating the bicentennial, but at the last moment Lisa decides that the legend has served to inspire the town and chooses to keep the secret. As Homer watches proudly, he notices that Ned has been reinstated as town crier and pushes him aside, then lets Lisa ring the crier's bell while riding on his shoulders.

== Production ==
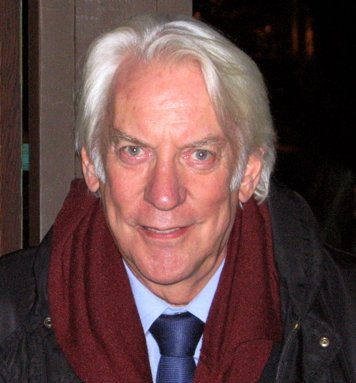
Donald Sutherland guest-starred in the episode as the voice of the historian.

The story was inspired by the real events surrounding the exhumation of President Zachary Taylor. In the late 1980s, college professor and author Clara Rising theorized that Taylor was murdered by poison and was able to convince Taylor's closest living relative and the Coroner of Jefferson County, Kentucky, to order an exhumation. On June 17, 1991, Taylor's remains were exhumed and transported to the Office of the Kentucky Chief Medical Examiner, who found that the level of arsenic was much smaller than would be expected if Taylor had been thus poisoned. The remains were then returned to the cemetery and received appropriate honors at reinterment. Then-show runner Bill Oakley said "Lisa the Iconoclast" is "essentially the same" story but with Lisa Simpson in the role as Rising. At the end of the episode, an ode to Jebediah Springfield is played over the credits. The music and lyrics were written by Jeff Martin.

Donald Sutherland voiced town historian Hollis Hurlbut in the episode, a part written specifically for him. Sutherland wanted to do the voice recordings as one would do a film and start in the middle of the script, so that he could get to know the character, but that idea was abandoned. In the episode, Lisa joked she was getting over her "Chester A. Arthuritis", a play on the word "arthritis" and the name of Chester A. Arthur. Sutherland ad-libbed the line "you had arthritis?" and the producers liked it so much that they kept it. Over a decade earlier, Sutherland had played a character named Homer Simpson in the unrelated movie The Day of the Locust (1975).

The episode opens with an old documentary on Jebediah Springfield, starring Troy McClure as Springfield. The writers tried to make this documentary seem as lousy and low-budget as possible. One of these tricks was to have post-production add scratches to the animation. The animators added production errors that would occur in a low-budget film. For example, a man in the crowd looks at the camera, some of the people are wearing wristwatches, McClure's stuntman does not have the same sideburns as he does, and a boom microphone can be seen entering the frame. In the Historical Society, the animators spent a significant amount of time decorating the walls. Besides numerous historical references, they also decorated the walls with The Simpsons characters in 18th-century settings. The first painting shows Otto Mann driving children in a horse-drawn carriage. Another painting shows Marge Simpson in silhouette. The last painting shows Professor Frink holding a kite in the manner of Benjamin Franklin.

== Cultural references ==
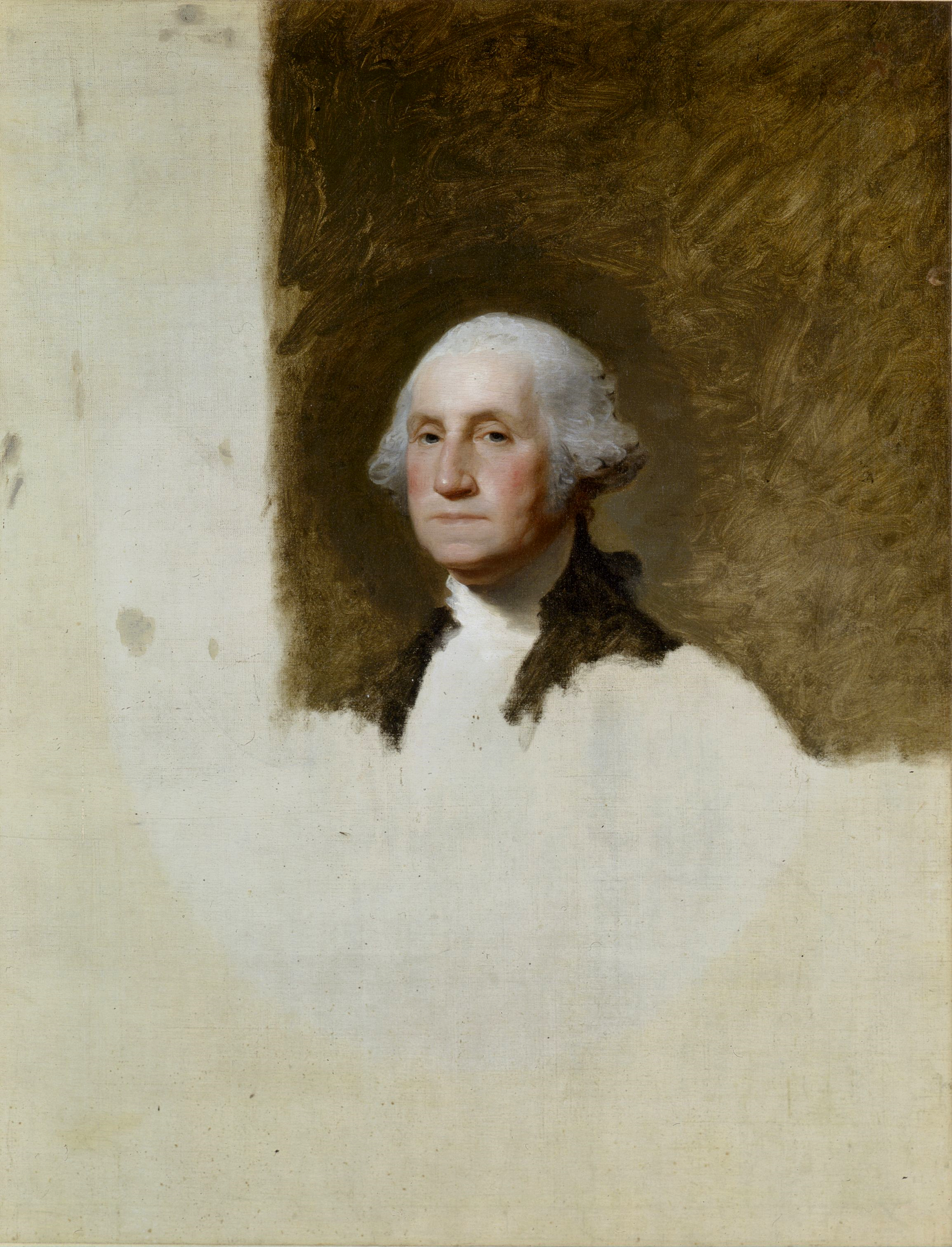
Gilbert Stuart's unfinished 1796 painting of George Washington, also known as The Athenaeum, plays an important part in "Lisa the Iconoclast".

The Historical Society of Springfield contains references to historical figures and facts. The episode features Gilbert Stuart's unfinished 1796 painting of George Washington and tells a fictional backstory of how it came to be. In reality, the painting was unfinished and it did not have a part torn off. Hurlbut mentions the American revolutionaries William Dawes and Samuel Allyne Otis as equals to Jebediah Springfield. When Lisa passes out the "Wanted for treason" posters, it is a reference to those featuring John F. Kennedy, which were circulated in Dallas prior to his assassination. Hurlbut claims Springfield's confessions are "just as fake" as the will of Howard Hughes and the diaries of Adolf Hitler, both of which are proven forgeries. The opening couch gag shows the Simpson family in blue boxes similar to the style of The Brady Bunch.

Chief Wiggum is singing "Camptown Races" from 1850 by Stephen Foster ventriloquised with the skull of Jebediah Springfield. Lisa's dream in which Washington and Springfield are fighting is a reference to Lethal Weapon. When Lisa is telling the people at Moe's Tavern about the real history of Jebediah Springfield, they all sit with their mouths open. This is a reference to a scene in the film The Producers from 1968. When Homer knocks over Ned Flanders in order to take over his job as town crier, it is a reference to the film National Lampoon's Animal House from 1978. Lisa's decision to hide the truth to preserve the legend of Jebediah Springfield is a reference to the film The Man Who Shot Liberty Valance. In addition to these cultural references, at least one author has compared this episode to Friedrich Nietzsche's short work On the Advantage and Disadvantage of History for Life.

== Reception ==
In its original broadcast, "Lisa the Iconoclast" finished 70th in the ratings for the week of February 12 to 18, 1996. The episode was the sixth highest-rated show on the Fox network that week, following The X-Files, Melrose Place, Beverly Hills, 90210, Married... with Children, and Fox Tuesday Night Movie: Cliffhanger.

The episode received extremely positive reviews from television critics.

DVD Movie Guide's Colin Jacobson lauded it for the focus on Lisa, commenting that "Lisa-centered episodes tend to be preachy, but I suppose that's inevitable given her character. I like the fact Lisa takes the high road here, though, as she proves she doesn't always have to be right. Homer's turn as the town crier brings mirth to a solid show."

In addition, John Alberti praised the episode in his book Leaving Springfield as "an especially cromulent example of the narrative fissuring and disruptive disclosure...Lisa spends the entire episode uncovering the truth about Jebediah and courageously defending her findings against a phalanx of authority figures...a symbol of honesty, integrity, and courage. All in all, a spectacular episode revealing the truth behind our society."

The authors of the book I Can't Believe It's a Bigger and Better Updated Unofficial Simpsons Guide, Gary Russell and Gareth Roberts, thought it was a "clever" episode, and highlighted Lisa's fantasy of the fight between Springfield and George Washington as "fantastic". Dave Foster of DVD Times thought Sutherland offered a "memorable" guest appearance.

Total Film's Nathan Ditum ranked Sutherland's performance as the 14th best guest appearance in the show's history. Michael Moran of The Times ranked the episode as the eighth best in the show's history.

Martin Belam of The Guardian named it one of the five greatest episodes in Simpsons history.

=== Legacy ===
The episode features two neologisms: embiggen and cromulent. The showrunners asked the writers if they could come up with two words which sounded like real words. The Springfield town motto is "A noble spirit embiggens the smallest man." Schoolteacher Edna Krabappel comments that she had never heard the word embiggen until she moved to Springfield. Miss Hoover, another teacher, replies, "I don't know why; it's a perfectly cromulent word." Later in the episode, while talking about Homer's audition for the role of town crier, Principal Skinner states, "He's embiggened that role with his cromulent performance."

Embiggen, coined by writer Dan Greaney, is a verb meaning 'to make larger'; its morphology (em- + big + -en) is similar to that of enlarge (en- + large). The verb had in fact been used by C. A. Ward in an 1884 edition of the British journal Notes and Queries, as an "English parallel as ugly" as Greek ἐμεγάλυνεν (Acts 5:13). The word has made its way to common use and was included in Mark Peters' Yada, Yada, Do'h!, 111 Television Words That Made the Leap From the Screen to Society. In 2018, it was included in the Merriam-Webster dictionary and the online Oxford English Dictionary. In particular, embiggen can be found in string theory, as in the journal High Energy Physics in the article "Gauge/gravity duality and meta-stable dynamical supersymmetry breaking", which was published on January 23, 2007. For example, the article says: "For large P, the three-form fluxes are dilute, and the gradient of the Myers potential encouraging an anti-D3 to embiggen is very mild." Later this usage was noted in the journal Nature, which explained that in this context, it means to grow or expand. The episode is a favorite of the producers; among them, series creator Matt Groening lists it as his all time favorite, stating that its reference of US history was "irrelevance". Showrunner Al Jean also lists it as one of his all time favorites.

Cromulent is an adjective that was coined by David X. Cohen. Since then it has appeared in Dictionary.com's 21st Century Lexicon. It was added to Merriam-Webster's Dictionary in September 2023. The meaning of cromulent is inferred only from its usage, which indicates that it is a positive attribute. Dictionary.com defines it as meaning 'fine' or 'acceptable'. Ben Macintyre has written that it means "valid or acceptable". In 2018, "cromulent" was added to the Oxford English Dictionary.

The episode garnered some attention in July 2024, when UK broadcaster Channel 4 conspicuously pulled a scheduled showing on 14 July, and replaced it with an episode from season 30 during a marathon of season 7 episodes. This was due to references to assassinations throughout the episode, and in light of the attempted assassination of Donald Trump in Pennsylvania hours prior.

Erik Adams writes that “'Lisa The Iconoclast' is a complex episode, and that complexity comes down to the way the show plays with Springfield’s infamous mob mentality. 'A noble spirit embiggens the smallest man' isn’t the episode’s only moral; it also teaches us that unthinking collective—the one that would spend unwisely on a flashy monorail or converge on the local brothel with torches and pitchforks—has a heart, too. As the resident know-it-all, it’s an important lesson for Lisa to learn: Just because she finds freedom in the truth doesn’t mean that everyone else will... once we’re dead and buried and someone has replaced our bodies with skeletons, we forfeit any control over the stories that are told about us. We can attempt to conduct the narrative from the beyond the grave with journals of our innermost thoughts and confessions to our gravest crimes, but if we’re lucky enough to be remembered, then the people doing the remembering are calling the shots. 'Lisa The Iconoclast' captures this sentiment beautifully, showing that the people of Springfield are the ones getting the last laugh over the pirate who tried so hard to dupe them all. They’ve turned him into the figure that unites them all, on both a grand city wide scale and on a smaller scale within the walls of 742 Evergreen Terrace. This takes a bigger chunk out of Sprungfeld’s reign of terror than George Washington’s wooden teeth ever could, and I cannot tell a lie: They did it with their parades and their educational films starring Troy McClure and their ceremonial bells. Lisa and Homer know the truth about Hans Sprungfeld, but the myth of Jebediah Springfield lives on. How cromulent."

== Merchandise ==
The episode was included on April 28, 1997, on the VHS set The Dark Secrets of the Simpsons, alongside "The Springfield Files", "Homer the Great", and "Homer Badman". On September 8, 2003, the VHS tape was released on DVD under the name The Simpsons: Dark Secrets in Region 2 and Region 4, but "Homer the Great" was replaced by "Homer to the Max". It was released again on DVD on December 13, 2005, as part of The Simpsons Complete Seventh Season. Bill Oakley, Josh Weinstein, Jonathan Collier, Yeardley Smith, Mike B. Anderson, and David Silverman participated in the DVD's audio commentary.
