= Mark de Berg =

Dutch computational geometer

Mark de Berg is a Dutch computational geometer, known as one of the authors of the textbook Computational Geometry: Algorithms and Applications (with Otfried Cheong, Marc van Kreveld, and Mark Overmars, Springer, 1997; 3rd ed., 2008).

De Berg completed his Ph.D. in 1992 at Utrecht University. His dissertation, Efficient Algorithms for Ray Shooting and Hidden Surface Removal, was supervised by Mark Overmars. He is a professor of computer science at the Eindhoven University of Technology.

With David Mount, de Berg was co-chair of the 2003 Symposium on Computational Geometry.
