= Journal of Computer and System Sciences =

- Discipline: Computer Science
- Language: English
- Edited by: Michael Segal

Publication details
- History: 1967–present
- Publisher: Elsevier
- Frequency: Bimonthly
- Open access: no
- Impact factor: 1.023 (2020)

Standard abbreviations
- ISO 4: J. Comput. Syst. Sci.
- MathSciNet: J. Comput. System Sci.

Indexing
- ISSN: 0022-0000

Links
- Journal homepage

The Journal of Computer and System Sciences (JCSS) is a peer-reviewed scientific journal in the field of computer science. JCSS is published by Elsevier, and it was started in 1967. Many influential scientific articles have been published in JCSS; these include five papers that have won the Gödel Prize. Its managing editor is Michael Segal.
