= Dan Halperin =

Israeli computer scientist

- דן הלפרין
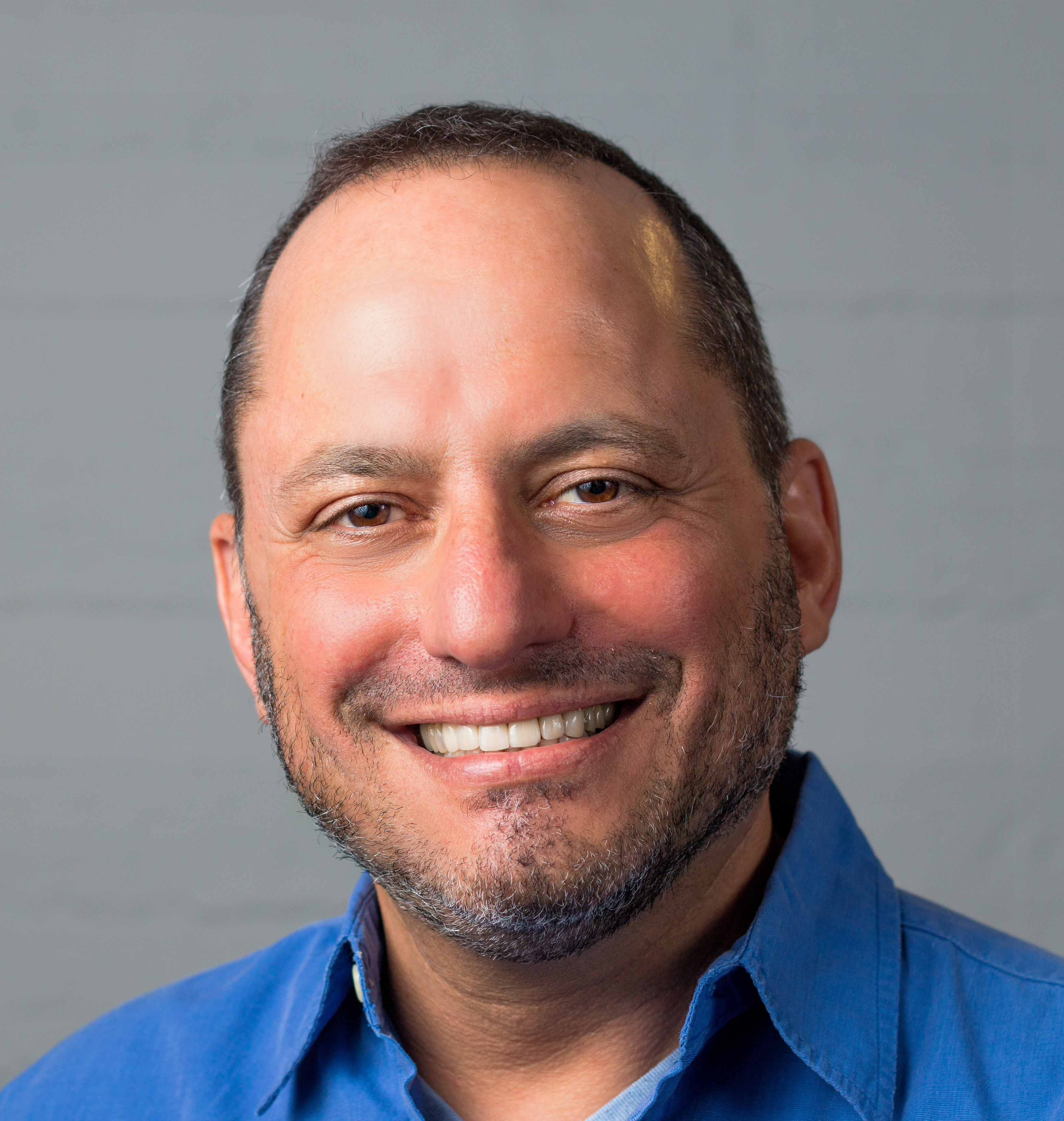
- Education: Tel Aviv University, Stanford University
- Scientific career
- Fields: Computer Science, Computational Geometry, Robotics
- Thesis: Algorithmic Motion Planning via Arrangements of Curves and of Surfaces
- Doctoral advisor: Micha Sharir
- Website: www.cgl.cs.tau.ac.il/people/dan-halperin/

Dan (Danny) Halperin (Hebrew: דן הלפרין) is an Israeli computer scientist known for his work on computational geometry and robotics. He is currently a Full Professor in the School of Computer Science at Tel Aviv University, and the CTO of Assembrix, a startup company in industrial 3D printing.

Halperin completed his Ph.D. at Tel Aviv University in 1992, under the supervision of Micha Sharir. His dissertation was Algorithmic Motion Planning via Arrangements of Curves and of Surfaces. He then spent three years as a research associate in the Computer Science Robotics Laboratory at Stanford University. He returned to Tel Aviv University as a faculty member in 1996, where he established the Computational Geometry Lab.

Halperin's main field of research is computational geometry and its applications, which include robotics, automated manufacturing, algorithmic motion planning for individual robots and multi-robot teams, assembly planning, and 3D printing. A major focus of his work has been in research and development of robust geometric software, in collaboration with a group of European universities and research institutes: the CGAL project and library, which has earned the SoCG "test of time" award. In CGAL he has been particularly active in the development of the 2D arrangements package, of which he has written a book.

Halperin was named as an IEEE Fellow in 2015, "for contributions to robust geometric algorithms for robotics and automation", and is a distinguished lecturer of the IEEE Robotics and Automation Society. He was named as a Fellow of the Association for Computing Machinery in 2018, "for contributions to robust geometric computing and applications to robotics and automation". He was a keynote speaker at the International Conference on Robotics and Automation (ICRA), the European Workshop on Computational Geometry (EuroCG), and the Workshop on the Algorithmic Foundations of Robotics (WAFR).
