= David X. Cohen =

American television writer (born 1966)

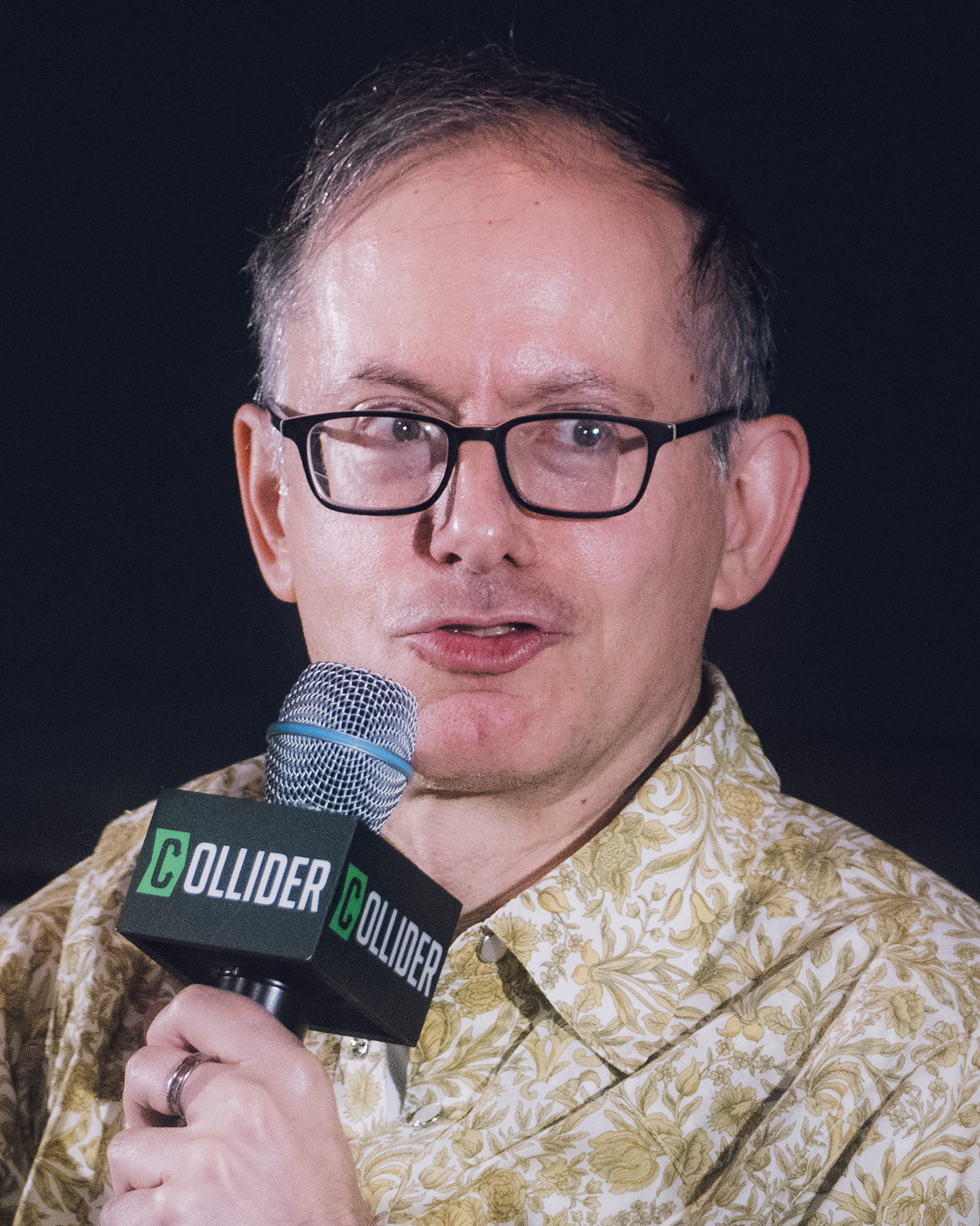
- Cohen in 2026
- Born: David Samuel Cohen; July 13, 1966 (age 60); New York City, U.S.
- Education: Harvard University (B.A.); University of California, Berkeley (M.S.)
- Occupation: Television writer
- Spouse: Patty Cohen
- Children: 1
- Writing career
- Period: 1992–present
- Genre: Comedy

David Samuel Cohen (born July 13, 1966), better known as David X. Cohen, is an American television writer. He wrote for The Simpsons, penning such episodes as "Lisa the Vegetarian" and "The Itchy & Scratchy & Poochie Show". He coined the word cromulent for the episode "Lisa the Iconoclast". He co-developed the animated television series Futurama with Simpsons creator Matt Groening.

== Early life ==
Cohen was born in New York City as David Samuel Cohen. He changed his middle initial around the time Futurama debuted due to Writers' Guild policies prohibiting more than one member from having the same name. Both of his parents were biologists, and growing up Cohen had always planned to be a scientist, though he also enjoyed drawing cartoons and writing. Cohen is of Jewish background.

Cohen graduated from Dwight Morrow High School in Englewood, New Jersey, where he wrote the humor column for the high school paper and was a member of the school's state champion mathematics team. Cohen graduated from Harvard University with a B.A. in physics, and the University of California, Berkeley, with a M.S. in computer science. At Harvard, he wrote for and served as President of the Harvard Lampoon.

In high school, Cohen wrote an Apple II compiler and video game in MOS 6502 assembly language, and unsuccessfully tried to publish the latter through Broderbund. His most notable academic publication concerned the theoretical computer science problem of pancake sorting.

== Career ==
After three years of graduate school, Cohen took a leave of absence and started writing sample TV scripts. In 1992, this landed him a job writing two of the earliest Beavis and Butt-Head episodes. In 1993, Cohen began working on The Simpsons, writing or co-writing thirteen episodes. Nearly five years later, Cohen would team with Matt Groening to develop Futurama, where he served as writer or co-writer of seven episodes and executive producer, head writer, and showrunner of the series' entire run. Cohen has won four Primetime Emmy Awards: Two for Futurama and two for The Simpsons.

=== Futurama ===
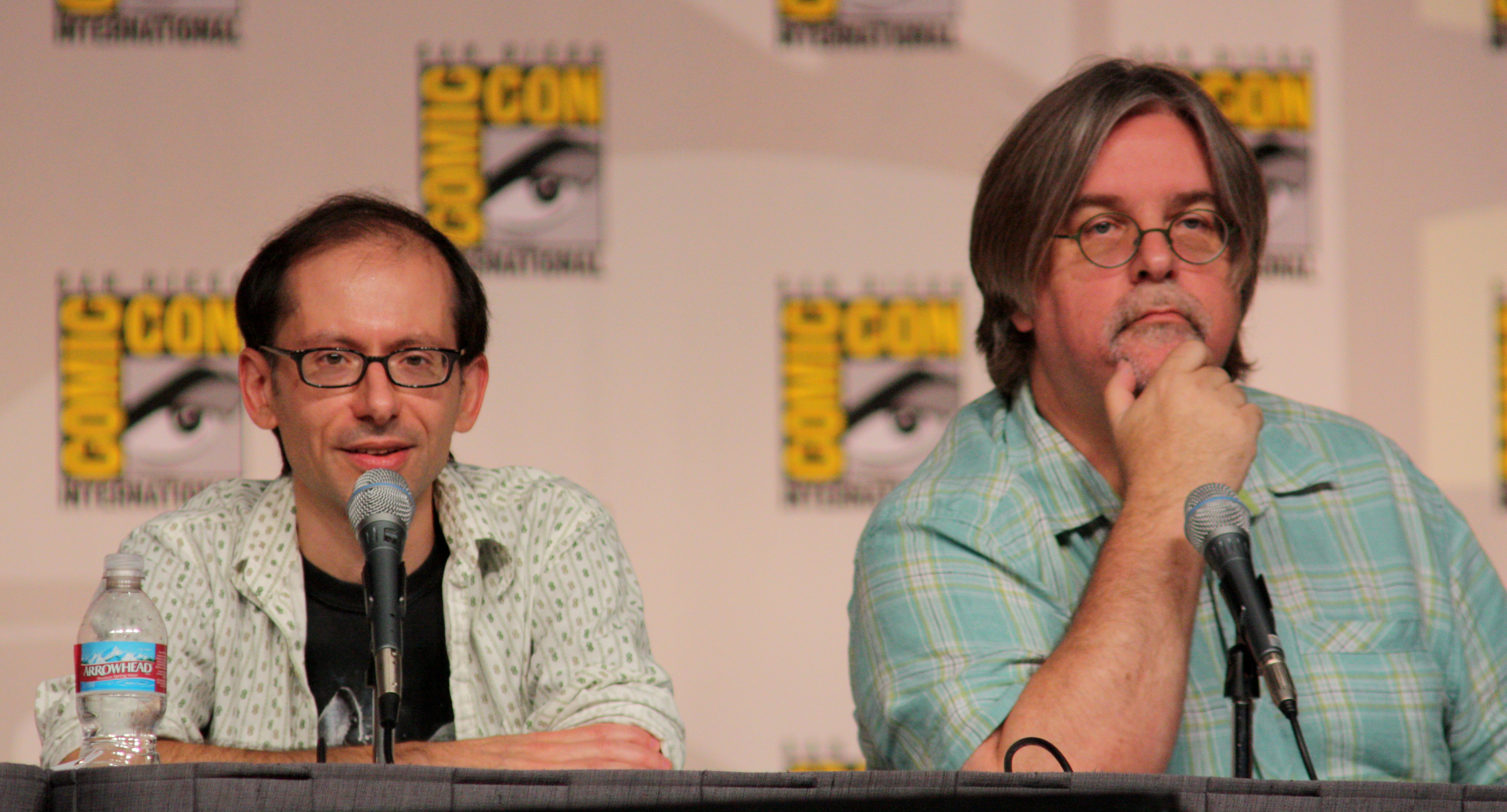
Cohen with Matt Groening at the Futurama panel of San Diego Comic-Con, 2009

Cohen co-developed Futurama, along with The Simpsons creator Matt Groening. Cohen served as head writer, executive producer, co-showrunner, and voice director of the series. He was also the voice director of the Futurama video game. After spending a few years researching science fiction, Groening got together with Cohen in 1996 and developed Futurama, an animated series about life in the year 3000. By the time they pitched the series to Fox in April 1998, Groening and Cohen had composed many characters and storylines; Groening claimed they had "gone overboard" in their discussions. Groening described trying to get the show on the air as "by far the worst experience of [his] grown-up life". The show premiered on March 28, 1999.

After four years on the air, the series was canceled by Fox. In a situation similar to the animated Family Guy, however, strong DVD sales and very stable ratings on Adult Swim brought Futurama back to life. When Comedy Central began negotiating for the rights to air Futurama reruns, Fox suggested that there was a possibility of also creating new episodes. When Comedy Central committed to sixteen new episodes, it was decided that four straight-to-DVD films—Bender's Big Score (2007), The Beast with a Billion Backs (2008), Bender's Game (2008) and Into the Wild Green Yonder (2009)—would be produced. Since no new Futurama projects were in production, the movie Into the Wild Green Yonder was designed to stand as the Futurama series finale. However, Groening had expressed a desire to continue the Futurama franchise in some form, including as a theatrical film. In an interview with CNN, Groening said that "we have a great relationship with Comedy Central and we would love to do more episodes for them, but I don't know... We're having discussions and there is some enthusiasm but I can't tell if it's just me."

Comedy Central picked up the show for 26 new half-hour episodes that began airing in mid-2010.

Cohen told Newsday in August 2009 that the reported 26-episode order means "[i]t will be up to 26. I can't guarantee it will be 26. But I think there's a pretty good chance it'll be exactly 26. Fox has been a little bit cagey about it, even internally. But nobody's too concerned. We're plunging ahead." Two episodes were in the process of being voice-recorded at that time, with an additional "six scripts ... in the works, ranging in scale from 'it's a crazy idea that someone's grandmother thought of' to 'it's all on paper'. ..."The first episode is tentatively titled 'Rebirth' — and in a surprisingly literal fashion, as things turn out". It aired June 24 on Comedy Central.

Cohen designed one of the robots in the robot strip club which he said was "his one artistic contribution to the show". The robot's waist gyrated sexily using a planetary gear. In an episode's commentary, this artistic contribution is discussed by Futurama co-creator Matt Groening, who describes Cohen as being very particular about how the animators used his design, and that Cohen's original drawing is still framed in his office.

He makes some brief cameo appearances in cartoon form, first in the Futurama episode "A Bicyclops Built for Two", along with several other people who worked on the show, and second on "I Dated a Robot" as a member of the eBay audience. Both appearances are pointed out during DVD commentaries.

=== Name change ===
When the FOX primetime animated shows unionized in 1998, Cohen was forced to use a different name for professional purposes, as there was already another member credited as David S. Cohen (who worked on Balto and Courage the Cowardly Dog). The Writers Guild of America does not allow multiple members to use the same name for onscreen credits. Instead of using his full middle name, he chose to use the middle initial "X"—because it sounded "sci-fi-ish"—and has jokingly said that the "X" would make him "the David Cohen people would remember". The "X" does not actually stand for anything, but Cohen included a period "so people don't think it's some mathematical formula: 'David times Cohen' or something".

== Writing credits ==
Cohen is credited with writing or co-writing the following episodes:

=== Beavis and Butt-Head ===
- "Couch Fishing"
- "Plate Frisbee"

=== The Simpsons ===
- "Treehouse of Horror V" ("Nightmare Cafeteria") (1994)
- "Lisa the Vegetarian" (1995)
- "Treehouse of Horror VI" ("Homer^{3}") (1995)
- "22 Short Films About Springfield" (co-contributor) (1996)
- "Much Apu About Nothing" (1996)
- "Treehouse of Horror VII" ("Citizen Kang") (1996)
- "The Itchy & Scratchy & Poochie Show" (1997)
- "The Simpsons Spin-Off Showcase" ("Chief Wiggum, P.I.") (1997)
- "Treehouse of Horror VIII" ("Fly vs. Fly") (1997)
- "Lisa the Skeptic" (1997)
- "Das Bus" (1998)
- "Bart the Mother" (1998)
- "Treehouse of Horror IX" ("Starship Poopers") (1998)
- "Podcast News" (2020)

=== Futurama ===
- "Space Pilot 3000" (with Matt Groening) (1999)
- "Xmas Story" (1999)
- "Anthology of Interest I" (Part 3) (2000)
- "The Day the Earth Stood Stupid" (shared story credits with Jeff Westbrook) (2001)
- "Anthology of Interest II" (Part 2) (2002)
- "The Why of Fry" (2003)
- Bender's Big Score (story with Ken Keeler) (2008)
- The Beast with a Billion Backs (story with Eric Kaplan) (2008)
- Bender's Game (both story and part 4 of the teleplay) (2009)
- Into the Wild Green Yonder (story with Ken Keeler; Parts 1 & 4) (2009)
- "Rebirth" (2010)
- "Free Will Hunting" (2012)
- "All the Way Down" (2023)
- "The Futurama Mystery Liberry" (with Jeanette Lim and Patric M. Verrone) (2024)
- "Destroy Tall Monsters" (2025)

=== Disenchantment ===
- "For Whom the Pig Oinks" (2018)
- "Stairway To Hell" (2019)

Cohen has also been credited with coining the word "cromulent", meaning "valid" or "acceptable", in The Simpsons episode "Lisa the Iconoclast". Subsequently, the word was included in Webster's New Millennium Dictionary. The meaning of cromulent is inferred only from its usage, which indicates that it is a positive attribute. Webster's Dictionary defines it as meaning "fine" or "acceptable".

== See also ==
- Burnt pancake graph
