= Sariel Har-Peled =

Israeli–American computer scientist (born 1971)

- שריאל הר-פלד
- Born: July 14, 1971 (age 55); Jerusalem, Israel
- Education: Tel Aviv University
- Known for: Computational geometry
- Notable work: Geometric approximation algorithms
- Awards: Donald Biggar Willett Professor in Engineering
- Scientific career
- Fields: Computer Science
- Workplaces: University of Illinois at Urbana–Champaign
- Doctoral advisor: Micha Sharir

Sariel Har-Peled (Hebrew: שריאל הר-פלד; born July 14, 1971, in Jerusalem) is an Israeli–American computer scientist known for his research in computational geometry. He is a Donald Biggar Willett Professor in Engineering at the University of Illinois at Urbana–Champaign.

Har-Peled was a student at Tel Aviv University, where he earned a bachelor's degree in mathematics and computer science in 1993, a master's degree in computer science in 1995, and a Ph.D. in 1999. His master's thesis, The Complexity of Many Cells in the Overlay of Many Arrangements, and his doctoral dissertation, Geometric Approximation Algorithms and Randomized Algorithms for Planar Arrangements, were both supervised by Micha Sharir. After postdoctoral research at Duke University, he joined the University of Illinois in 2000. He was named Willett Professor in 2016.

Har-Peled is the author of a book on approximation algorithms in computational geometry, Geometric approximation algorithms (American Mathematical Society, 2011).
