= Esther Arkin =

Israeli–American mathematician

- אסתר ארקין
- Education: Tel Aviv University; Stanford University
- Scientific career
- Fields: Computer science
- Workplaces: Stony Brook University; Cornell University
- Doctoral advisor: Christos Papadimitriou

Esther M. (Estie) Arkin (Hebrew: אסתר ארקין) is an Israeli–American mathematician and computer scientist whose research interests include operations research, computational geometry, combinatorial optimization, and the design and analysis of algorithms. She is a professor of applied mathematics and statistics at Stony Brook University. At Stony Brook, she also directs the undergraduate program in applied mathematics and statistics, and is an affiliated faculty member with the department of computer science.

== Education and career ==
Arkin graduated from Tel Aviv University in 1981. She earned a master's degree at Stanford University in 1983, and completed her Ph.D. at Stanford in 1986. Her doctoral dissertation, Complexity of Cycle and Path Problems in Graphs, was supervised by Christos Papadimitriou. After working as a visiting professor at Cornell University, she joined the Stony Brook faculty in 1991.

== Selected publications ==
- Arkin, Esther M.; Silverberg, Ellen B. (September 1987), "Scheduling jobs with fixed start and end times", Discrete Applied Mathematics, 18 (1): 1–8, doi:10.1016/0166-218X(87)90037-0, MR 0905173
- Arkin, Esther; Joneja, Dev; Roundy, Robin (April 1989), "Computational complexity of uncapacitated multi-echelon production planning problems", Operations Research Letters, 8 (2): 61–66, doi:10.1016/0167-6377(89)90001-1
- Arkin, E. M.; Chew, L. P.; Huttenlocher, D. P.; Kedem, K.; Mitchell, J. S. B. (March 1991), "An efficiently computable metric for comparing polygonal shapes", IEEE Transactions on Pattern Analysis and Machine Intelligence, 13 (3): 209–216, Bibcode:1991ITPAM..13..209A, doi:10.1109/34.75509, hdl:1813/8729, S2CID 8247618
- Arkin, Esther M.; Hassin, Refael (December 1994), "Approximation algorithms for the geometric covering salesman problem", Discrete Applied Mathematics, 55 (3): 197–218, doi:10.1016/0166-218X(94)90008-6, MR 1308878
- Arkin, Esther M.; Fekete, Sándor P.; Mitchell, Joseph S. B. (October 2000), "Approximation algorithms for lawn mowing and milling", Computational Geometry: Theory and Applications, 17 (1–2): 25–50, doi:10.1016/S0925-7721(00)00015-8, MR 1794471
- Arkin, Esther M.; Bender, Michael A.; Demaine, Erik D.; Fekete, Sándor P.; Mitchell, Joseph S. B.; Sethia, Saurabh (January 2005), "Optimal covering tours with turn costs", SIAM Journal on Computing, 35 (3): 531–566, arXiv:cs/0309014, doi:10.1137/S0097539703434267, MR 2201447, S2CID 1174606
