= Richard M. Pollack =

American mathematician

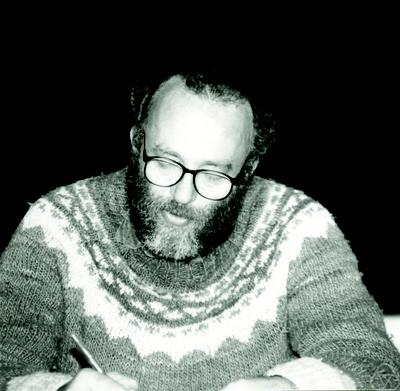
- Born: January 25, 1935; New York City, New York, U.S.
- Died: September 18, 2018 (aged 83); Montclair, New Jersey, U.S.
- Education: Brooklyn College; New York University
- Scientific career
- Fields: Mathematics
- Workplaces: Courant Institute of Mathematical Sciences, New York
- Doctoral advisor: Harold N. Shapiro

Richard M. Pollack (January 25, 1935 – September 18, 2018) was an American geometer who spent most of his career at the Courant Institute of Mathematical Sciences at New York University, where he was professor emeritus until his death.

== Contributions ==
In combinatorics, Pollack published several papers with Paul Erdős and János Pach.

Pollack also published papers in discrete geometry. His work with Jacob E. Goodman includes the first nontrivial bounds on the number of order types and polytopes, and a generalization of the Hadwiger transversal theorem to higher dimensions. He and Goodman were the founding editors of the journal Discrete & Computational Geometry.

In real algebraic geometry, Pollack wrote a series of papers with Saugata Basu and Marie-Françoise Roy, as well as a book.

== Awards and honors ==
In 2003, a collection of original research papers in discrete and computational geometry entitled Discrete and Computational Geometry: The Goodman–Pollack Festschrift was published as a tribute to Jacob E. Goodman and Richard Pollack on the occasion of their 2/3 × 100 birthdays.

In 2012, he became a fellow of the American Mathematical Society.

A special memorial 556-page issue of Discrete & Computational Geometry for Pollack was published in October 2020.
