= Jacob E. Goodman =

American geometer (1933–2021)

- Born: November 15, 1933; Lynn, Massachusetts
- Died: October 10, 2021 (aged 87); San Rafael, California
- Education: New York University; Columbia University
- Awards: Fellow of the American Mathematical Society (2012)
- Scientific career
- Fields: Mathematics, Music
- Workplaces: City College of New York
- Doctoral advisor: Heisuke Hironaka

Jacob Eli Goodman (November 15, 1933 – October 10, 2021) was an American geometer who spent most of his career at the City College of New York, where he was professor emeritus.

== Research ==
Together, he and Richard M. Pollack, his long-term collaborator, introduced concepts such as "allowable sequences of permutations" and "wiring diagrams", which have played an important role in discrete geometry, specifically in the study of arrangements of pseudolines and (more generally) oriented matroids. His work with Pollack includes such results as the first nontrivial bounds on the number of order types of polytopes, and a generalization of the Hadwiger transversal theorem to higher dimensions. He and Pollack were the founding editors of the journal Discrete & Computational Geometry.

Goodman was the originator of the "pancake problem", an elementary question on permutations which he published under the pseudonym Harry Dweighter. The problem gave rise to the concept of pancake sorting.

Goodman co-edited the book Handbook of Discrete and Computational Geometry with Joseph O'Rourke.

== Music ==
In 1999, Goodman returned to an old love, musical composition, and in 2002 was founding president of the New York Composers Circle.

== Awards ==
In 2012 he became a fellow of the American Mathematical Society.

== Selected publications ==
- Dweighter, Harry; Garey, Michael R.; Johnson, David S.; Lin, Shen (1977), "Solutions of Elementary Problem E2569", American Mathematical Monthly, 84: 296, doi:10.2307/2318878, JSTOR 2318878.
- Goodman, Jacob E. (1980), "Proof of a conjecture of Burr, Grünbaum, and Sloane", Discrete Mathematics, 32: 27–35, doi:10.1016/0012-365x(80)90096-5.
- Goodman, Jacob E.; Pollack, Richard (1983), "Multidimensional sorting", SIAM Journal on Computing, 12 (3): 484–507, doi:10.1137/0212032.
- Goodman, Jacob E.; Pollack, Richard (1984), "Semispaces of configurations, cell complexes of arrangements", Journal of Combinatorial Theory, Series A, 37 (3): 257–293, doi:10.1016/0097-3165(84)90050-5.
- Goodman, Jacob E.; Pollack, Richard (1995), "Foundations of a theory of convexity on affine Grassmann manifolds", Mathematika, 42 (2): 305–328, doi:10.1112/s0025579300014613.
- Goodman, Jacob E.; Pollack, Richard; Sturmfels, Bernd (1990), "The intrinsic spread of a configuration in R^d", Journal of the American Mathematical Society, 3: 639–651, doi:10.1090/s0894-0347-1990-1046181-2
- Cappell, Sylvain; Goodman, Jacob E.; Pach, János; Pollack, Richard; Sharir, Micha; Wenger, Rephael (1994), "Common tangents and common transversals", Advances in Mathematics, 106 (2): 198–215, doi:10.1006/aima.1994.1056.
- Goodman, Jacob E.; Pach, János; Pollack, Richard, eds. (2008), Surveys on Discrete and Computational Geometry: Twenty Years Later, Contemporary Mathematics, vol. 453, American Mathematical Society.
