= Marc van Kreveld =

Dutch computational geometer

Marc Johan van Kreveld is a Dutch computational geometer, known as one of the authors of the textbook Computational Geometry: Algorithms and Applications (with Mark de Berg, Otfried Cheong, and Mark Overmars, Springer, 1997; 3rd ed., 2008).

Van Kreveld completed his Ph.D. in 1992 at Utrecht University. His dissertation, New Results on Data Structures in Computational Geometry, was supervised by Mark Overmars. He is a professor of computer science at Utrecht University.

With Ferran Hurtado, van Kreveld was co-chair of the 2011 Symposium on Computational Geometry. He has also worked in geographic information systems, and (with Jürg Nievergelt, Thomas Roos, and Peter Widmayer) is the author of the textbook Algorithmic Foundations of Geographic Information Systems (Springer, 1997).
