= Algorithmic Geometry =

1995 mathematics text

- Author: Jean-Daniel Boissonnat and Mariette Yvinec
- Original title: Géometrie algorithmique
- Translator: Hervé Brönnimann
- Language: French
- Publisher: Edusciences
- Publication date: 1995

Algorithmic Geometry is a textbook on computational geometry. It was originally written in the French language by Jean-Daniel Boissonnat and Mariette Yvinec, and published as Géometrie algorithmique by Edusciences in 1995. It was translated into English by Hervé Brönnimann, with improvements to some proofs and additional exercises, and published by the Cambridge University Press in 1998.

== Topics ==
The book covers the theoretical background and analysis of algorithms in computational geometry, their implementation details, and their applications. It is grouped into five sections, the first of which covers background material on the design and analysis of algorithms and data structures, including computational complexity theory, and techniques for designing randomized algorithms. Its subsequent sections each consist of a chapter on the mathematics of a subtopic in this area, presented at the level of detail needed to analyze the algorithms, followed by two or three chapters on algorithms for that subtopic.

The topics presented in these sections and chapters include convex hulls and convex hull algorithms, low-dimensional randomized linear programming, point set triangulation for two- and three-dimensional data, arrangements of hyperplanes, of line segments, and of triangles, Voronoi diagrams, and Delaunay triangulations.

== Audience and reception ==
The book can be used as a graduate textbook, or as a reference for computational geometry research. Reviewer Peter McMullen calls it "a welcome addition to the shelves of anyone interested in algorithmic geometry".
