= Boris Aronov =

American computer scientist

- Born: March 13, 1963 (age 62)
- Occupation: New York University

Boris Aronov (born March 13, 1963) is a computer scientist, currently a professor at the Tandon School of Engineering, New York University. His main area of research is computational geometry. He is a Sloan Research Fellow.

Aronov earned his B.A. in computer science and mathematics in 1984 from Queens College, City University of New York. He went on to graduate studies at the Courant Institute of Mathematical Sciences of New York University, where he received his M.S. in 1986 and Ph.D. in 1989, under the supervision of Micha Sharir.
