= Discrete & Computational Geometry =

- Discipline: Discrete geometry, computational geometry
- Language: English
- Edited by: Kenneth L. Clarkson, János Pach, Csaba D. Tóth.

Publication details
- History: 1986–present
- Publisher: Springer
- Frequency: Quarterly
- Impact factor: 0.969 (2020)

Standard abbreviations
- ISO 4: Discrete Comput. Geom.

Indexing
- CODEN: DCGEER
- ISSN: 0179-5376 (print); 1432-0444 (web)
- LCCN: 90656510

Links
- Journal homepage

Discrete & Computational Geometry is a peer-reviewed mathematics journal published quarterly by Springer. Founded in 1986 by Jacob E. Goodman and Richard M. Pollack, the journal publishes articles on discrete geometry and computational geometry.

== Abstracting and indexing ==
The journal is indexed in:

- Mathematical Reviews
- Zentralblatt MATH
- Science Citation Index
- Current Contents

== Notable articles ==
Two articles published in Discrete & Computational Geometry, one by Gil Kalai in 1992 with a proof of a subexponential upper bound on the diameter of a polytope and another by Samuel Ferguson in 2006 on the Kepler conjecture on optimal three-dimensional sphere packing, earned their authors the Fulkerson Prize.
