= Frank Nielsen (Australian footballer) =

Australian rules footballer

Personal information
- Full name: Francis Ormond Nielsen
- Born: 1 March 1891; Preston, Victoria
- Died: 3 December 1970 (aged 79); Heidelberg, Victoria
- Height: 178 cm (5 ft 10 in)
- Weight: 73 kg (161 lb)

Playing career^{1}
Years	Club	Games (Goals)
1925	Footscray	4 (0)
- ^{1} Playing statistics correct to the end of 1925.

Francis Ormond Nielsen (1 March 1891 – 3 December 1970) was an Australian rules footballer who played with Footscray in the Victorian Football League (VFL).
