= Mariette Yvinec =

French mathematician

Mariette Yvinec is a French researcher in computational geometry at the French Institute for Research in Computer Science and Automation (INRIA) in Sophia Antipolis. She is one of the developers of CGAL, a software library of computational geometry algorithms.

Yvinec is the co-author of two books in computational geometry:

- Géometrie Algorithmique (with Jean-Daniel Boissonnat, Edusciences 1995), translated as Algorithmic Geometry (Hervé Brönnimann, trans., Cambridge University Press, 1998)
- Geometric and Topological Inference (with Jean-Daniel Boissonnat and Frédéric Chazal, Cambridge Texts in Applied Mathematics, 2018)
