= Geometric and Topological Inference =

Monograph

- First edition
- Author: Jean-Daniel Boissonnat; Frédéric Chazal; Mariette Yvinec
- Language: English
- Series: Cambridge Texts in Applied Mathematics
- Genre: Non-fiction
- Publisher: Cambridge University Press
- Publication date: 2018

Geometric and Topological Inference is a monograph in computational geometry, computational topology, geometry processing, and topological data analysis, on the problem of inferring properties of an unknown space from a finite point cloud of noisy samples from the space. It was written by Jean-Daniel Boissonnat, Frédéric Chazal, and Mariette Yvinec, and published in 2018 by the Cambridge University Press in their Cambridge Texts in Applied Mathematics book series. The Basic Library List Committee of the Mathematical Association of America has suggested its inclusion in undergraduate mathematics libraries.

== Topics ==
The book is subdivided into four parts and 11 chapters. The first part covers basic tools from topology needed in the study, including simplicial complexes, Čech complexes and Vietoris–Rips complex, homotopy equivalence of topological spaces to their nerves, filtrations of complexes, and the data structures needed to represent these concepts efficiently in computer algorithms. A second introductory part concerns material of a more geometric nature, including Delaunay triangulations and Voronoi diagrams, convex polytopes, convex hulls and convex hull algorithms, lower envelopes, alpha shapes and alpha complexes, and witness complexes.

With these preliminaries out of the way, the remaining two sections show how to use these tools for topological inference. The third section is on recovering the unknown space itself (or a topologically equivalent space, described using a complex) from sufficiently well-behaved samples. The fourth part shows how, with weaker assumptions about the samples, it is still possible to recover useful information about the space, such as its homology and persistent homology.

== Audience and reception ==
Although the book is primarily aimed at specialists in these topics, it can also be used to introduce the area to non-specialists, and provides exercises suitable for an advanced course. Reviewer Michael Berg evaluates it as an "excellent book" aimed at a hot topic, inference from large data sets, and both Berg and Mark Hunacek note that it brings a surprising level of real-world applicability to formerly-pure topics in mathematics.
