= Jean-Daniel Boissonnat =

French computer scientist

- Born: 18 May 1953 (age 73)
- Education: Supelec
- Scientific career
- Fields: Computer science
- Workplaces: Inria
- Doctoral students: Monique Teillaud

Jean-Daniel Boissonnat (French: [ʒɑ̃ danjɛl bwasɔna]; born 18 May 1953) is a French computer scientist, who works as a director of research at the French Institute for Research in Computer Science and Automation (INRIA). He is an invited professor of computational geometry at the Collège de France, holding the Chair in Informatics and Computational Sciences for 2016–2017.

Boissonat was one of the founders of the CGAL project for implementing geometric algorithms. With Mariette Yvinec, he is the author of the book Algorithmic Geometry (Cambridge University Press, 1998, translated from a 1995 edition in French). With Yvinec and Frédéric Chazal, he is the coauthor of Geometric and Topological Inference (Cambridge University Press, 2018).

== Awards and honours ==
- 1987: IBM award in Computer Science
- 2006: EADS award in Information Sciences
- 2006: Knight of National Order of Merit
- 2013: ANR Digital Technology Award
