= Mark Overmars =

Dutch computer scientist (born 1958)

- Born: 29 September 1958 (age 68); Zeist, Netherlands
- Education: Utrecht University
- Known for: Probabilistic Roadmap Method, GameMaker
- Scientific career
- Fields: Computational geometry Robotics
- Workplaces: Utrecht University
- Thesis: The Design of Dynamic Data Structures (1983)
- Doctoral advisor: Jan van Leeuwen
- Doctoral students: Marc van Kreveld

Markus Hendrik "Mark" Overmars (Dutch pronunciation: [ˈmɑrkʏs ˈɦɛndrɪk ˈmɑr(ə)k ˈoːvərmɑrs]; born 29 September 1958) is a Dutch computer scientist and teacher of game programming known for his game development application GameMaker. GameMaker allows users to create computer games using a drag-and-drop interface. He is the former head of the Center for Geometry, Imaging, and Virtual Environments at Utrecht University in the Netherlands. This research center focuses on computational geometry and its applications in areas such as computer graphics, robotics, geographic information systems, imaging, multimedia, virtual environments, and games.

Overmars received his Ph.D. in 1983 from Utrecht University under the supervision of Jan van Leeuwen, and remained a faculty member at the same university until September 2013. Overmars has published over 100 journal papers, largely on computational geometry, and is a co-author of several widely used textbooks on the subject.

Overmars has also worked in robotics. He was the first to develop the probabilistic roadmap method in 1992, which was later independently discovered by Kavraki and Latombe in 1994. Their joint paper, Probabilistic roadmaps for path planning in high-dimensional configuration spaces, is considered one of the most influential studies in motion planning, and has been widely cited (more than 2,500 times as of 2014, according to Google Scholar).

In 2011, Overmars and game designer Jochem Schut developed a snake video game called Super Snake HD as a mobile app, which was published by YoYo Games.

Overmars founded and served as the CTO of Tingly Games from 2012 until its acquisition by CoolGames in 2016. Tingly focused on HTML5 games and e-cards/casual games, the latter of which are also known as "greeting games."

He founded Quarterfall in June 2020 together with Arjan Egges. Quarterfall is a teaching product that helps teachers use formative assessment to improve the learning processes their students, compared to just assessing their performance.

He is also the original author of the XForms toolkit.

== Books ==
- Overmars, M. H. (1983). The Design of Dynamic Data Structures. Lecture Notes in Computer Science. Vol. 156. Springer-Verlag. ISBN 0-387-12330-X.
- de Berg, M.; van Kreveld, M.; Overmars, M. H.; Schwarzkopf, O. (1997). Computational Geometry: Algorithms and Applications. Springer-Verlag. 2nd ed., 2000; 3rd ed., 2008.
- Habgood, J.; Overmars, M. H. (2006). The Game Maker's Apprentice: Game Development for Beginners. APress. ISBN 1-59059-615-3.
