= Micha Sharir =

Israeli mathematician and computer scientist

Professor Micha Sharir Ph.D.
- מיכה שריר
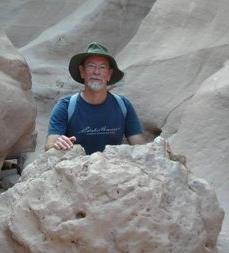
- Micha Sharir in 2004
- Born: 8 June 1950 (age 75); Tel Aviv, Israel
- Citizenship: Israel
- Education: Tel Aviv University; Courant Institute, New York University
- Known for: Computational geometry Combinatorial geometry
- Awards: Israel Defense Prize (1975); Doctorate, honorary, Utrecht University (1996); Association for Computing Machinery Fellow (1997); Feher Foundation Prize in Computer Science (1999); Landau Prize for Science and Research (2002); The EMET Prize for Art, Science and Culture (2007); Knuth Prize (2025)
- Scientific career
- Fields: Computer science Mathematics
- Institutions: New York University; Tel Aviv University
- Thesis: Extreme Operators Between Banach Spaces (1976)
- Doctoral advisor: Aldo Lazar
- Doctoral students: Pankaj K. Agarwal; Boris Aronov; Dan Halperin; Sariel Har-Peled; Matthew (Matya) Katz; Klara Kedem; Vladlen Koltun

Micha Sharir (Hebrew: מיכה שריר; born 8 June 1950 in Tel Aviv, Israel) is an Israeli mathematician and computer scientist. He is a professor at Tel Aviv University, notable for his contributions to computational geometry and combinatorial geometry, having authored hundreds of papers.

== Biography ==
Sharir was born in Tel Aviv in 1950. As a secondary school student he won the first place in the youth mathematics olympics of the Weizmann Institute of Science and Grossman Award from the Technion. In 1970, he completed his undergraduate studies and then served in unit 8200 of the Israel Defense Forces, during his service he was involved in a research team which won the 1975 Israel Defense Prize. In 1976, Sharir completed his doctoral (Ph.D.) studies in pure mathematics under the supervision of Aldo Lazar in Tel Aviv University. Then he began his postdoctoral studies at the Courant Institute of New York University, where he worked with Jack Schwartz.

In 1980, he joined the faculty of Tel Aviv University, where he holds the Isaias Nizri Chair in Computational Geometry and Robotics as of 2020. He is also a visiting research professor at the Courant Institute, where he has been the deputy head of the Robotics Lab (1985–89). At Tel Aviv University, he has served as head of the computer science department (twice), head of the school of mathematics (1997–99), and is one of the cofounders of the Minerva Center for Geometry.

Sharir was named a Fellow of the Association for Computing Machinery in 1997. He received an honorary doctorate from Utrecht University in 1996, the Feher Foundation Prize in Computer Science from the Jerusalem Institute for Israel Studies in 1999, the Landau Prize for Science and Research in 2002, and the million-dollar The EMET Prize for Art, Science and Culture in the Exact Sciences from the A.M.N. Foundation in 2007.

Sharir is an Institute for Scientific Information, ISI Highly Cited researcher.

He was involved with developing international standards in programming and informatics, as a member of the International Federation for Information Processing (IFIP) IFIP Working Group 2.1 on Algorithmic Languages and Calculi, which specified, maintains, and supports the programming languages ALGOL 60 and ALGOL 68.
