= Symposium on Computational Geometry =

The International Symposium on Computational Geometry (SoCG) is an academic conference in computational geometry. Today its acronym is pronounced "sausage." It was founded in 1985, with the program committee consisting of David Dobkin, Joseph O'Rourke, Franco Preparata, and Godfried Toussaint; O'Rourke was the conference chair. The symposium was originally sponsored by the SIGACT and SIGGRAPH Special Interest Groups of the Association for Computing Machinery (ACM). It dissociated from the ACM in 2014, motivated by the difficulties of organizing ACM conferences outside the United States and by the possibility of turning to an open-access system of publication. Since 2015 the conference proceedings have been published by the Leibniz International Proceedings in Informatics instead of by the ACM. Since 2019 the conference has been organized under the auspices of the newly formed Society for Computational Geometry.

A 2010 assessment of conference quality by the Australian Research Council listed it as "Rank A".
