= Petra Mutzel =

German computer scientist

- Education: University of Cologne
- Scientific career
- Fields: Computer science
- Workplaces: University of Bonn
- Doctoral advisor: Michael Jünger

Petra Mutzel is a German computer scientist, a University Professor of computer science at the University of Bonn. Her research is in the areas of algorithm engineering, graph drawing and combinatorial optimization.

== Education and career ==
Mutzel earned a diploma in 1990 from the University of Augsburg, in mathematics with computer science. She then earned a doctorate in computer science from the University of Cologne in 1994 under the supervision of Michael Jünger, and her habilitation in 1999 from the Max Planck Institute for Informatics. She held a professorship at the Vienna University of Technology beginning in 1999, moving to the Technical University of Dortmund in 2004 and then to the University of Bonn in 2019.

== Contributions ==
In graph drawing, Mutzel has contributed in work on planarization, crossing minimization in layered graph drawing, and SPQR trees, and co-edited a book on graph drawing. She was both the program chair and organizational chair of the 9th International Symposium on Graph Drawing, in Vienna in 2001.

Mutzel's other contributions include works on the Ising model, steganography, and Steiner trees. In 2012, she was program committee co-chair of the Meeting on Algorithm Engineering and Experiments (ALENEX).

== Selected publications ==
- De Simone, C.; Diehl, M.; Jünger, M.; Mutzel, P.; Reinelt, G.; Rinaldi, G. (July 1995), "Exact ground states of Ising spin glasses: New experimental results with a branch-and-cut algorithm", Journal of Statistical Physics, 80 (1–2): 487–496, Bibcode:1995JSP....80..487D, doi:10.1007/BF02178370, S2CID 9364389.
- Jünger, M.; Mutzel, P. (1996), "Maximum planar subgraphs and nice embeddings: practical layout tools", Algorithmica, 16 (1): 33–59, doi:10.1007/s004539900036, MR 1394493.
- Jünger, Michael; Mutzel, Petra (1997), "2-layer straightline crossing minimization: performance of exact and heuristic algorithms", Journal of Graph Algorithms and Applications, 1 (1): 1–25, doi:10.7155/jgaa.00001, MR 1478845, S2CID 782954.
- Gutwenger, Carsten; Mutzel, Petra (2001), "A linear time implementation of SPQR-trees", Graph Drawing: 8th International Symposium, GD 2000 Colonial Williamsburg, VA, USA, September 20–23, 2000, Proceedings, Lecture Notes in Computer Science, vol. 1984, Berlin: Springer-Verlag, pp. 77–90, doi:10.1007/3-540-44541-2_8, ISBN 978-3-540-41554-1.
- Jünger, Michael; Mutzel, Petra, eds. (2004), Graph Drawing Software, Mathematics and Visualization, Berlin: Springer-Verlag, doi:10.1007/978-3-642-18638-7, ISBN 978-3-540-00881-1, MR 2159308.
- Hetzl, Stefan; Mutzel, Petra (2005), "A graph–theoretic approach to steganography", Communications and Multimedia Security: 9th IFIP TC-6 TC-11 International Conference, CMS 2005, Salzburg, Austria, September 19 – 21, 2005, Proceedings, Lecture Notes in Computer Science, vol. 3677, Berlin: Springer-Verlag, pp. 119–128, doi:10.1007/11552055_12, ISBN 978-3-540-28791-9.
- Ljubić, Ivana; Weiskircher, René; Pferschy, Ulrich; Klau, Gunnar W.; Mutzel, Petra; Fischetti, Matteo (2006), "An algorithmic framework for the exact solution of the prize-collecting Steiner tree problem", Mathematical Programming, 105 (2–3, Ser. B): 427–449, doi:10.1007/s10107-005-0660-x, MR 2190829, S2CID 10535226.
