= Kobon triangle problem =

Unsolved problem in combinatorial geometry

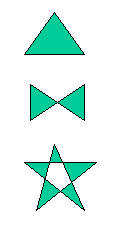
Kobon triangles generated with 3, 4 and 5 straight line segments.

Unsolved problem in mathematics
How many non-overlapping triangles can be formed in an arrangement of $k$ lines?
More unsolved problems in mathematics

The Kobon triangle problem is an unsolved problem in combinatorial geometry first stated by Kobon Fujimura (1903-1983). The problem asks for the largest number N(k) of nonoverlapping triangles whose sides lie on an arrangement of k lines. Variations of the problem consider the projective plane rather than the Euclidean plane, and require that the triangles not be crossed by any other lines of the arrangement.

== Known upper bounds ==
Saburo Tamura proved that the number of nonoverlapping triangles realizable by $k$ lines is at most $\lfloor k(k-2)/3\rfloor$. G. Clément and J. Bader proved more strongly that this bound cannot be achieved when $k$ is congruent to 0 or 2 modulo 6. The maximum number of triangles is therefore at most one less in these cases. The same bounds can be equivalently stated, without use of the floor function, as:
$$\begin{cases}
\frac 13 k (k-2) & \text{when } k \equiv 3,5 \pmod{6}; \\
\frac 13 (k+1)(k-3) & \text{when } k \equiv 0,2 \pmod{6}; \\
\frac 13 (k^2-2k-2) & \text{when } k \equiv 1,4 \pmod{6}.
\end{cases}$$

Solutions yielding this number of triangles are known when $k$ is 3, 4, 5, 6, 7, 8, 9, 13, 15, 17, 19, 21, 23, 25, 27, 29, 31 or 33. For k = 10, 11 and 12, the best solutions known reach a number of triangles one less than this upper bound.

Furthermore, the upper bound for even values $k$ can be improved: $\lfloor k(k-7/3)/3\rfloor$. This bound can be reached for 10, 12 and 16.

The upper bound for k = 11 has long been thought not to be reachable, which was shown to be correct in 2025 by Pavlo Savchuk with the use of a SAT solver.

== Known constructions ==
The following bounds are known:

k	3	4	5	6	7	8	9	10	11	12	13	14	15	16	17	18	19	20	21	23	25	27	29	31	33	OEIS
Tamura's upper bound on N(k)	1	2	5	8	11	16	21	26	33	40	47	56	65	74	85	96	107	120	133	161	191	225	261	299	341	A032765
Improvements on Tamura's	1	2	5	7	11	15	21	25	32	38	47	54	65	72	85	94	107	117	133	161	191	225	261	299	341	-
best known solution	1	2	5	7	11	15	21	25	32	38	47	54	65	72	85	93	107	117	133	161	191	225	261	299	341	A006066

== In the projective plane ==
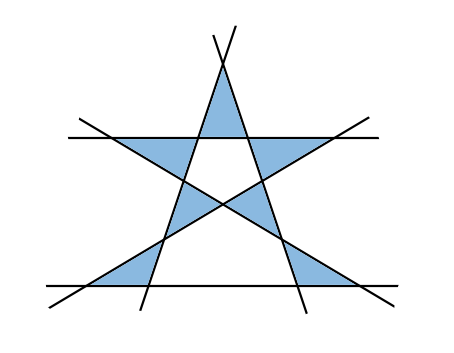
Five lines forming a pentagram, with one more horizontal line below them, form seven triangles: five in the pentagram, and two more formed by pairs of rays emanating from the corners of the pentagram. If the lower horizontal line is moved to the line at infinity of the projective plane, all five pairs of rays emanating from the pentagram would form triangles with it.

The version of the problem in the projective plane allows more triangles. In this version, it is convenient to include the line at infinity as one of the given lines, after which the triangles appear in three forms:

- ordinary triangles among the remaining lines, bounded by three finite line segments,
- triangles bounded by two rays that meet at a common apex and by a segment of the line at infinity, and
- triangles bounded by a finite line segment and by two parallel rays that meet at a vertex on the line at infinity.

For instance, an arrangement of five finite lines forming a pentagram, together with a sixth line at infinity, has ten triangles: five in the pentagram, and five more bounded by pairs of rays.

D. Forge and J. L. Ramirez Alfonsin provided a method for going from an arrangement in the projective plane with $k>3$ lines and $\tfrac13k(k-1)$ triangles (the maximum possible for $k>3$), with certain additional properties, to another solution with $K=2k-1$ lines and $\tfrac13K(K-1)$ triangles (again maximum), with the same additional properties. As they observe, it is possible to start this method with the projective arrangement of six lines and ten triangles described above, producing optimal projective arrangements whose numbers of lines are

6, 11, 21, 41, 81, ... .

Thus, in the projective case, there are infinitely many different numbers of lines for which an optimal solution is known.

== In pseudoline arrangements ==
The traditional problem of triangles in the Euclidean plane is often broken down into two parts: the equivalent problem but with an arrangement of pseudolines, and the problem of the stretchability of the pseudoline arrangements that have an optimal triangle count. When working with pseudolines, pure combinatorics and group theory may be leveraged without needing to worry about violating rules like the theorem of Pappus or Desargues's theorem.

A pseudoline arrangement is said to be stretchable if it is combinatorially equivalent to a line arrangement, meaning that you can straighten each one while maintaining the order in which each crosses each other, but it is complete for the existential theory of the reals to distinguish stretchable arrangements from non-stretchable ones.

== Examples ==
3 lines, 1 triangle

4 lines, 2 triangles

5 lines, 5 triangles

6 lines, 7 triangles

7 lines, 11 triangles

19 lines, 107 triangles	21 lines, 133 triangles

== See also ==
- Roberts's triangle theorem, on the minimum number of triangles that $n$ lines can form
