= Beck's theorem =

Beck's theorem may refer to either of two mathematical results:

- Beck's monadicity theorem or the Beck tripleability theorem (1964/2003), by Jonathan Mock Beck, on monadic functors in category theory
- Beck's theorem (geometry) (1983) by József Beck, on finite collections of points in discrete geometry
