= K-set =

K-set or K set may refer to:

- K-set (geometry)
- New South Wales K set, an electric multiple unit train formerly used in Sydney, Australia
