= Kazimierz Zarankiewicz =

Polish mathematician (1902–1959)

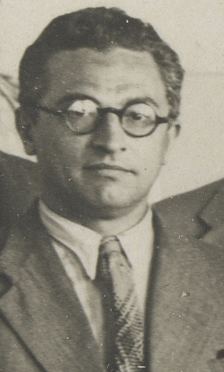
- Zarankiewicz in Moscow 1935
- Born: 2 May 1902; Częstochowa, Congress Poland, Russian Empire
- Died: 5 September 1959 (aged 57); London, England
- Education: University of Warsaw
- Known for: Zarankiewicz problem Zarankiewicz crossing number conjecture
- Scientific career
- Fields: Topology; Graph theory
- Workplaces: University of Warsaw
- Thesis: Sur les points de division dans les ensembles connexes (1923)
- Doctoral advisor: Wacław Sierpiński

Signature
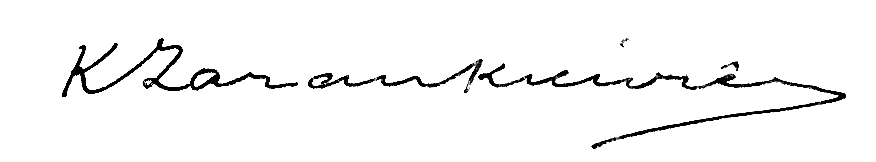

Kazimierz Zarankiewicz (2 May 1902 – 5 September 1959) was a Polish mathematician and Professor at the Warsaw University of Technology who was interested primarily in topology and graph theory.

== Biography ==
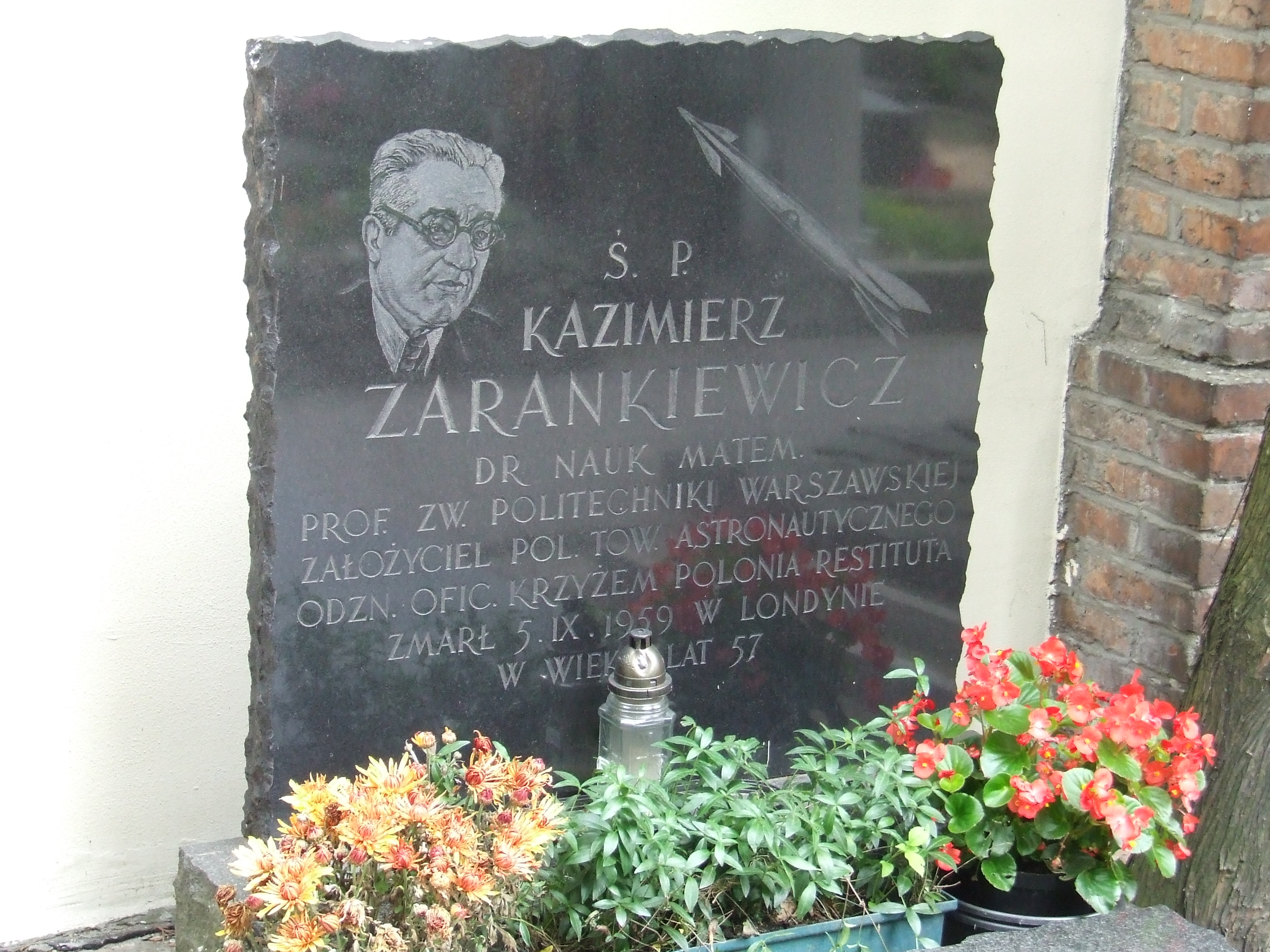
Grave of Kazimierz Zarankiewicz in Powązki Cemetery, Warsaw

Zarankiewicz was born in Częstochowa, to father Stanisław and mother Józefa (née Borowska). He studied at the University of Warsaw, together with Zygmunt Janiszewski, Stefan Mazurkiewicz, Wacław Sierpiński, Kazimierz Kuratowski, and Stanisław Saks. In 1923, he earned his doctorate based on his thesis Sur les points de division dans les ensembles connexes written under the supervision of Wacław Sierpiński. In 1924-1928, Zarankiewicz worked as a mathematics teacher at the General Sowiński Municipal Gymnasium in Warsaw. In 1929, he obtained his habilitation and started work as a docent at the University of Warsaw.

From 1930 to 1931, Zarankiewicz pursued further studies abroad visiting Vienna, where he collaborated with Karl Menger, and Berlin, where his collaborators included Richard von Mises and Stefan Bergman.

During World War II, Zarankiewicz took part in illegal teaching, forbidden by the German authorities, and was eventually sent to a concentration camp. He survived and became a teacher at Warsaw University of Technology (Polish: Politechnika Warszawska). His investigations into triangular numbers influenced Wacław Sierpiński to conduct further research in this area.

He visited universities in Tomsk, Harvard, London, and Vienna. He served as president of the Warsaw section of the Polish Mathematical Society and the International Astronautical Federation.

He died in London, England.

== Research contributions ==
Zarankiewicz wrote works on cut-points in connected spaces, on conformal mappings, on complex functions and number theory, and triangular numbers.

The Zarankiewicz problem is named after Zarankiewicz. This problem asks, for a given size of (0,1)-matrix, how many matrix entries must be set equal to 1 in order to guarantee that the matrix contains at least one a × b submatrix is made up only of 1's. An equivalent formulation in extremal graph theory asks for the maximum number of edges in a bipartite graph with no complete bipartite subgraph K_{a,b}.

The Zarankiewicz crossing number conjecture in the mathematical field of graph theory is also named after Zarankiewicz. The conjecture states that the crossing number of a complete bipartite graph $K_{m,n}$ equals

$$\text{cr}(K_{m,n}) = \left\lfloor\frac{n}{2}\right\rfloor\left\lfloor \frac{n-1}{2}\right\rfloor\left\lfloor \frac{m}{2}\right\rfloor\left\lfloor \frac{m-1}{2}\right\rfloor.\$$

Zarankiewicz proved that this formula is an upper bound for the actual crossing number. The problem of determining the number $\text{cr}(K_{m,n})$ was suggested by Paul Turán and became known as Turán's brick factory problem.

== See also ==
- List of Polish mathematicians
