= Crossing number (graph theory) =

Fewest edge crossings in drawing of a graph

A drawing of the Heawood graph with three crossings. This is the minimum number of crossings among all drawings of this graph, so the graph has crossing number cr(G) = 3.

In graph theory, the crossing number cr(G) of a graph G is the lowest number of edge crossings of a plane drawing of the graph G. For instance, a graph is planar if and only if its crossing number is zero. Determining the crossing number continues to be of great importance in graph drawing, as user studies have shown that drawing graphs with few crossings makes it easier for people to understand the drawing.

The study of crossing numbers originated in Turán's brick factory problem, in which Pál Turán asked for a factory plan that minimized the number of crossings between tracks connecting brick kilns to storage sites. Mathematically, this problem can be formalized as asking for the crossing number of a complete bipartite graph. The same problem arose independently in sociology at approximately the same time, in connection with the construction of sociograms. Turán's conjectured formula for the crossing numbers of complete bipartite graphs remains unproven, as does an analogous formula for the complete graphs.

The crossing number inequality states that, for graphs where the number e of edges is sufficiently larger than the number n of vertices, the crossing number is at least proportional to e^{3}/n^{2}. It has applications in VLSI design and incidence geometry.

Without further qualification, the crossing number allows drawings in which the edges may be represented by arbitrary curves. A variation of this concept, the rectilinear crossing number, requires all edges to be straight line segments, and may differ from the crossing number. In particular, the rectilinear crossing number of a complete graph is essentially the same as the minimum number of convex quadrilaterals determined by a set of n points in general position. The problem of determining this number is closely related to the happy ending problem and to Sylvester's four point problem in geometric probability.

== Definitions ==
For the purposes of defining the crossing number, a drawing of an undirected graph is a mapping from the vertices of the graph to disjoint points in the plane, and from the edges of the graph to curves connecting their two endpoints. No vertex should be mapped onto an edge that it is not an endpoint of, and whenever two edges have curves that intersect (other than at a shared endpoint) their intersections should form a finite set of proper crossings, where the two curves are transverse. A crossing is counted separately for each of these crossing points, for each pair of edges that cross. The crossing number of a graph is then the minimum, over all such drawings, of the number of crossings in a drawing.

Some authors add more constraints to the definition of a drawing, for instance that each pair of edges have at most one intersection point (a shared endpoint or crossing). For the crossing number as defined above, these constraints make no difference, because a crossing-minimal drawing cannot have edges with multiple intersection points. If two edges with a shared endpoint cross, the drawing can be changed locally at the crossing point, leaving the rest of the drawing unchanged, to produce a different drawing with one fewer crossing. And similarly, if two edges cross two or more times, the drawing can be changed locally at two crossing points to make a different drawing with two fewer crossings. However, these constraints are relevant for variant definitions of the crossing number that, for instance, count only the numbers of pairs of edges that cross rather than the number of crossings.

== Special cases ==
As of April 2015, crossing numbers are known for very few graph families. In particular, except for a few initial cases, the crossing number of complete graphs, bipartite complete graphs, and products of cycles all remain unknown, although there has been some progress on lower bounds.

=== Complete bipartite graphs ===
An optimal drawing of K_{4,7} showing that Turán's brick factory problem with 4 storage sites (yellow spots) and 7 kilns (blue spots) requires 18 crossings (red dots)

During World War II, Hungarian mathematician Pál Turán was forced to work in a brick factory, pushing wagon loads of bricks from kilns to storage sites. The factory had tracks from each kiln to each storage site, and the wagons were harder to push at the points where tracks crossed each other, from which Turán was led to ask his brick factory problem: how can the kilns, storage sites, and tracks be arranged to minimize the total number of crossings? Mathematically, the kilns and storage sites can be formalized as the vertices of a complete bipartite graph, with the tracks as its edges. A factory layout can be represented as a drawing of this graph, so the problem becomes: what is the minimum possible number of crossings in a drawing of a complete bipartite graph?

Kazimierz Zarankiewicz attempted to solve Turán's brick factory problem; his proof contained an error, but he established a valid upper bound of

$$\textrm{cr}(K_{m,n}) \le \left\lfloor\frac{n}{2}\right\rfloor\left\lfloor\frac{n-1}{2}\right\rfloor\left\lfloor\frac{m}{2}\right\rfloor\left\lfloor\frac{m-1}{2}\right\rfloor$$

for the crossing number of the complete bipartite graph K_{m,n}. This bound has been conjectured to be the optimal number of crossings for all complete bipartite graphs.

=== Complete graphs and graph coloring ===
Unsolved problem in mathematics
Can any complete graph be drawn with fewer crossings than the number given by Richard Guy?
More unsolved problems in mathematics

The problem of determining the crossing number of the complete graph was first posed by Anthony Hill, and appeared in print in 1960. Hill and his collaborator John Ernest were two constructionist artists fascinated by mathematics. They not only formulated this problem but also originated a conjectural formula for this crossing number, which Richard K. Guy published in 1960. Namely, it is known that there always exists a drawing with

$$\textrm{cr}(K_p) \le \frac{1}{4} \left\lfloor\frac{p}{2}\right\rfloor\left\lfloor\frac{p-1}{2}\right\rfloor\left\lfloor\frac{p-2}{2}\right\rfloor\left\lfloor\frac{p-3}{2}\right\rfloor$$

crossings. This formula gives values of 1, 3, 9, 18, 36, 60, 100, 150, 225, 315 for p = 5, ..., 14; see sequence A000241 in the On-line Encyclopedia of Integer Sequences. The conjecture is that there can be no better drawing, so that this formula gives the optimal number of crossings for the complete graphs. An independent formulation of the same conjecture was made by Thomas L. Saaty in 1964.

Saaty further verified that this formula gives the optimal number of crossings for p ≤ 10 and Pan and Richter showed that it also is optimal for p = 11, 12.

The Albertson conjecture, formulated by Michael O. Albertson in 2007, states that, among all graphs with chromatic number n, the complete graph K_{n} has the minimum number of crossings. That is, if the conjectured formula for the crossing number of the complete graph is correct, then every n-chromatic graph has crossing number at least equal to the same formula. The Albertson conjecture is now known to hold for n ≤ 16.

The rectilinear crossing number of complete graphs differs from the (topological) crossing number, and is closely related to Sylvester's four point problem in geometric probability.

=== Cubic graphs ===
The smallest cubic graphs with crossing numbers 1–11 are known (sequence A110507 in the OEIS). The smallest 1-crossing cubic graph is the complete bipartite graph K_{3,3}, with 6 vertices. The smallest 2-crossing cubic graph is the Petersen graph, with 10 vertices. The smallest 3-crossing cubic graph is the Heawood graph, with 14 vertices. The smallest 4-crossing cubic graph is the Möbius-Kantor graph, with 16 vertices. The smallest 5-crossing cubic graph is the Pappus graph, with 18 vertices. The smallest 6-crossing cubic graph is the Desargues graph, with 20 vertices. None of the four 7-crossing cubic graphs, with 22 vertices, are well known. The smallest 8-crossing cubic graphs include the Nauru graph and the McGee graph or (3,7)-cage graph, with 24 vertices. The smallest 11-crossing cubic graphs include the Coxeter graph with 28 vertices.

In 2009, Pegg and Exoo conjectured that the smallest cubic graph with crossing number 13 is the Tutte–Coxeter graph and the smallest cubic graph with crossing number 170 is the Tutte 12-cage.

== Connections to the bisection width ==
The 2/3-bisection width $b(G)$ of a simple graph $G$ is the minimum number of edges whose removal results in a partition of the vertex set into two separated sets so that no set has more than $2n/3$vertices. Computing $b(G)$ is NP-hard. Leighton proved that $\operatorname{cr}(G)+n=\Omega(b^2(G))$, provided that $G$ has bounded vertex degrees. This fundamental inequality can be used to derive an asymptotic lower bound for $\operatorname{cr}(G)$, when $b(G)$, or an estimate of it is known. In addition, this inequality has algorithmic application. Specifically, Bhat and Leighton used it (for the first time) for deriving an upper bound on the number of edge crossings in a drawing which is obtained by a divide and conquer approximation algorithm for computing $\operatorname{cr}(G)$.

== Complexity and approximation ==
In general, determining the crossing number of a graph is hard; Garey and Johnson showed in 1983 that it is an NP-hard problem. In fact the problem remains NP-hard even when restricted to cubic graphs and to near-planar graphs (graphs that become planar after removal of a single edge). A closely related problem, determining the rectilinear crossing number, is complete for the existential theory of the reals.

On the positive side, there are efficient algorithms for determining whether the crossing number is less than a fixed constant k. In other words, the problem is fixed-parameter tractable. It remains difficult for larger k, such as k = |V|/2. There are also efficient approximation algorithms for approximating $\operatorname{cr}(G)+n$ on graphs of bounded degree which use the general and previously developed framework of Bhat and Leighton. In practice heuristic algorithms are used, such as the simple algorithm which starts with no edges and continually adds each new edge in a way that produces the fewest additional crossings possible. These algorithms are used in the Rectilinear Crossing Number distributed computing project.

== The crossing number inequality ==
For an undirected simple graph G with n vertices and e edges such that e > 7n the crossing number is always at least

$$\operatorname{cr}(G) \geq \frac{e^3}{29 n^2}.$$

This relation between edges, vertices, and the crossing number was discovered independently by Ajtai, Chvátal, Newborn, and Szemerédi, and by Leighton . It is known as the crossing number inequality or crossing lemma.

The constant 29 is the best known to date, and is due to Ackerman. The constant 7 can be lowered to 4, but at the expense of replacing 29 with the worse constant of 64.

The motivation of Leighton in studying crossing numbers was for applications to VLSI design in theoretical computer science. Later, Székely also realized that this inequality yielded very simple proofs of some important theorems in incidence geometry, such as Beck's theorem and the Szemerédi-Trotter theorem, and Tamal Dey used it to prove upper bounds on geometric k-sets.

== Variations ==
If edges are required to be drawn as straight line segments, rather than arbitrary curves, then some graphs need more crossings. The rectilinear crossing number is defined to be the minimum number of crossings of a drawing of this type. It is always at least as large as the crossing number, and is larger for some graphs. It is known that, in general, the rectilinear crossing number can not be bounded by a function of the crossing number. The rectilinear crossing numbers for K_{5} through K_{12} are 1, 3, 9, 19, 36, 62, 102, 153, (A014540) and values up to K_{27} are known, with K_{28} requiring either 7233 or 7234 crossings. Further values are collected by the Rectilinear Crossing Number project.

Among all of the known optimal solutions for the maximal number of halving lines for a set $S$ of $n$ points, a subset of the valid solutions for every solved $n$ uses the same point set as the known optimal solutions to the rectilinear crossing number $\overline{cr}(n)$ of the same number of vertices. A halving line here is one which passes through 2 points in $S$, and equally bisects the remaining points. A conjecture exists for the relationship between halving lines and $\overline{cr}(n)$ for a set of $n$ points, which states that, for each arrangement of points in which $\overline{cr}(n)$ is minimized, the number of halving lines is maximized. The opposite relation is known not to be true, as some arrangements of points which maximize the number of halving lines have a quadrilateral as a convex hull, while all arrangements maximizing $\overline{cr}(n)$ have a triangular convex hull.

A graph has local crossing number k if it can be drawn with at most k crossings per edge, but not fewer. The graphs that can be drawn with at most k crossings per edge are also called k-planar.

Other variants of the crossing number include the pairwise crossing number (the minimum number of pairs of edges that cross in any drawing) and the odd crossing number (the number of pairs of edges that cross an odd number of times in any drawing). The odd crossing number is at most equal to the pairwise crossing number, which is at most equal to the crossing number. However, by the Hanani–Tutte theorem, whenever one of these numbers is zero, they all are. Schaefer (2014, 2018) surveys many such variants.

== See also ==
- Planarization, a planar graph formed by replacing each crossing by a new vertex
- Three utilities problem, the puzzle that asks whether K_{3,3} can be drawn with 0 crossings
