= Chandrajit Bajaj =

American computer scientist

- Born: 1958 (age 67–68); India
- Citizenship: (United States) USA
- Education: Cornell University
- Scientific career
- Fields: Computer science
- Workplaces: The University of Texas at Austin
- Doctoral advisor: John Edward Hopcroft
- Doctoral students: Tamal Dey; Yongjie Jessica Zhang

Chandrajit Bajaj (born 1958 in Calcutta, India) is an American computer scientist. He is a professor of computer science at the University of Texas at Austin holding the Computational Applied Mathematics Chair in Visualization and is the director of the Computational Visualization Center, in the Institute for Computational Engineering and Sciences (ICES).

== Career ==
Dr. Bajaj studied Computer Science at the Indian Institute of Technology Delhi and obtained his BTech degree in 1980. From there he went on to Cornell University, where he obtained his master's degree and PhD in Computer Science, in 1983 and 1984, respectively. He held a faculty position in computer science at Purdue University from 1984 to 1997, a visiting assistant professorship in Computer Sciences at Cornell University from 1990 to 1991, and was the Director of the Image Analysis and Visualization Center at Purdue University from 1996 to 1997. Since 1997, he has been a professor of Computer Sciences, the Computational and Applied Mathematics Chair of Visualization, and the director of the Computational Visualization Center at The University of Texas at Austin.

Bajaj's research has been in the fields of computational biology, geometric modeling, image processing, computational geometry, computer graphics, compression, mesh generation, scientific computation, and visualization.

Bajaj is a current editorial board member for the ACM Computing Surveys, the International Journal on Computational Geometry and Applications, and the SIAM Journal on Imaging Sciences. He has been an associate editor of the ACM Transactions on Graphics. Bajaj served as the conference program chair or co-chair for the ACM Symposium on Computational Geometry in 2002 and the SIAM Conference on Geometric and Physical Modeling in 2011.

== Awards ==
Bajaj has been selected as a fellow of the Association for Computing Machinery (2009) and the American Association of the Advancement of Sciences (2008). His research has been awarded the Moncrief Grand Challenge Faculty Award in 2011. Several of his publications have been selected for best paper awards including Computer Aided Design and the 2010 Symposium on Solid and Physical Modeling.

== Selected publications ==
Bajaj has authored or co-authored over 100 articles in scholarly journals as well authoring or editing several books listed below.

=== Books ===
- C. Bajaj, ed. (1994). Algebraic Geometry and its Applications. Springer-Verlag. ISBN 978-0-387-94176-9.
- J. Bloomenthal; C. Bajaj; J. Blinn; M. Gascuel; A. Rockwood; B. Wyvill; G. Wyvill (1997). Introduction to Implicit Surfaces. Morgan Kaufmann Publishers Inc.
- C. Bajaj, ed. (1998). Data Visualization Techniques. John Wiley and Sons.
- C. Christensen; G. Sunderam; A. Sathaye; C. Bajaj, eds. (2004). Algebra, Arithmetic and Geometry with Applications. Springer-Verlag.
