= Engineering with Computers =

Scientific journal

- Discipline: Computer simulations, computer-aided engineering
- Language: English
- Edited by: Yongjie Jessica Zhang

Publication details
- History: 1985—present
- Publisher: Springer
- Frequency: Bimonthly
- Impact factor: 4.9 (2024)

Standard abbreviations
- ISO 4: Eng. Comput.

Indexing
- ISSN: 0177-0667 (print); 1435-5663 (web)

Links
- Journal homepage; Online access; Online archive

Engineering with Computers: An International Journal for Simulation-Based Engineering is a peer-reviewed scientific journal published bimonthly by Springer Science+Business Media. Established in 1985, it covers research on computer simulations for engineering applications (computer-aided engineering). Its current editor-in-chief is Yongjie Jessica Zhang (Carnegie Mellon University).

== Abstracting and indexing ==
The journal is abstracted and indexed in:

- Current Contents/Engineering, Computing & Technology
- Inspec
- ProQuest databases
- Scopus
- Science Citation Index Expanded
- zbMATH Open

According to the Journal Citation Reports, the journal has a 2024 impact factor of 4.9.
