= Samuel Roberts (mathematician) =

British mathematician (1827–1913)

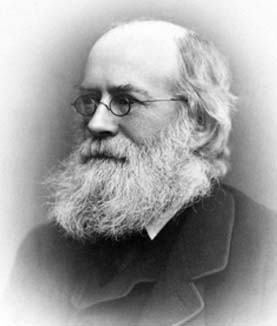
Samuel Roberts

Samuel Roberts FRS (15 December 1827, in Horncastle, Lincolnshire – 18 September 1913, in London) was a British mathematician.

Roberts studied at Queen Elizabeth's Grammar School, Horncastle. He matriculated in 1845 at the University of London, where he earned in 1847 his bachelor's degree in mathematics and in 1849 his master's degree in mathematics and physics, as first in his class. Next he studied law and became a solicitor in 1853. After a few years of law practice he abandoned his law career and returned to mathematics, although he never had an academic position. He had his first mathematical paper published in 1848. In 1865 he was an important participant in the founding of the London Mathematical Society (LMS). From 1866 to 1892 he acted as legal counsel for LMS, from 1872 to 1880 he was the organization's treasurer, and from 1880 to 1882 its president. In 1896 he received the De Morgan Medal of the LMS. In 1878 he was elected FRS.

Roberts published papers in several fields of mathematics, including geometry, interpolation theory, and Diophantine equations.

Roberts and Pafnuty Chebyschev are jointly credited with the Roberts-Chebyshev theorem related to four-bar linkages. Roberts's triangle theorem, on the minimum number of triangles that $n$ lines can form, is also named after Roberts, who published the theorem (with an unconvincing proof) in 1889.
