= William T. Trotter =

American mathematician

William Thomas Trotter Jr. is an American mathematician, who is on the faculty of the Department of Mathematics at the Georgia Institute of Technology. His main expertise is partially ordered sets, but he has also done significant work in other areas of combinatorics, such as the Szemerédi–Trotter theorem and Chvátal-Rödl-Szemerédi-Trotter theorem.

He completed his Ph.D. at the University of Alabama-Tuscaloosa in 1969; his thesis, titled On Universal Subcontinua, was written under the direction of William Jesse Gray. Trotter is the author of the book Combinatorics and partially ordered sets: dimension theory (Johns Hopkins University Press, 1992). With Mitchel Keller, he is also the author of a self-published textbook, Applied Combinatorics (2017).
