= Yongjie Jessica Zhang =

American mechanical engineer

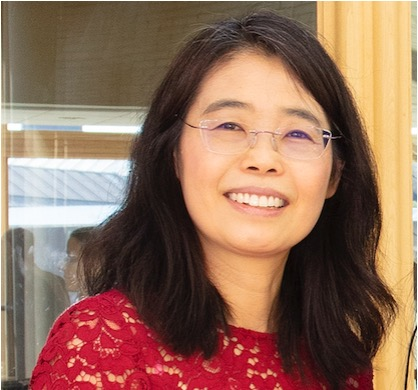
- Education: Tsinghua University; The University of Texas at Austin
- Known for: Computational geometry, Isogeometric analysis, Image processing
- Awards: David P. Casasent Outstanding Research Award (2020); Presidential Early Career Award for Scientists and Engineers (2012); NSF CAREER (2012); ONR Young Investigator Award (2010)
- Scientific career
- Fields: Mechanical Engineering; Biomedical engineering
- Workplaces: Carnegie Mellon University
- Academic advisors: Thomas J.R. Hughes (postdoc advisor); Chandrajit Bajaj (PhD advisor)
- Website: www.andrew.cmu.edu/user/jessicaz/

Yongjie Jessica Zhang is an American mechanical engineer. She is the George Tallman Ladd and Florence Barrett Ladd Professor of mechanical engineering and, by courtesy, of biomedical engineering at Carnegie Mellon University. She is the Editor-in-Chief of the journal, Engineering with Computers.

== Contributions ==
Zhang's research involves geometric modeling, mesh generation, image processing, finite element method and isogeometric analysis. She has applied her research for biomedicine and in particular for analysing blood vessels and neurons, as well as to ship design and the design of fiber-reinforced composite building materials.

== Education ==
Zhang is originally from Henan, China, and earned a bachelor's degree in automotive engineering and a master's degree in engineering mechanics at Tsinghua University. She then moved to the University of Texas at Austin, where she earned a second master's degree in aerospace engineering and engineering mechanics, and a Ph.D. from the University of Texas Institute for Computational Engineering and Sciences (now Oden Institute) under the supervision of Chandrajit Bajaj.

After staying on at the University of Texas for postdoctoral studies with Bajaj and Thomas J.R. Hughes, she joined the mechanical engineering department at Carnegie Mellon in 2007.

== Recognition ==
Zhang is the recipient of Simons Visiting Professorship from Mathematisches Forschungsinstitut Oberwolfach of Germany (2019), US Presidential Early Career Award for Scientists and Engineers (2012), NSF CAREER Award (2012) and Office of Naval Research Young Investigator Award (2010). The US Association for Computational Mechanics (USACM) awarded Zhang their Gallagher Young Investigator Medal (2013), "for pioneering research in high-fidelity geometric modeling and mesh generation with broad interdisciplinary finite element applications in computational biomedicine, material sciences and engineering". At CMU, she received David P. Casasent Outstanding Research Award (2020), George Tallman Ladd and Florence Barrett Ladd Professorship (2019), Clarence H. Adamson Career Faculty Fellow in Mechanical Engineering (2014), Donald L. & Rhonda Struminger Faculty Fellow (2011), and George Tallman Ladd Research Award (2010). She is a Fellow of Solid Modeling Association (SMA, 2021), American Institute for Medical and Biological Engineering (AIMBE, 2020), American Society of Mechanical Engineers (ASME, 2019), USACM (2019), and Executive Leadership in Academic Technology, Engineering and Science (ELATES) at Drexel (2017-2018). She was elected to the 2023 Class of SIAM Fellows. She was honored as the 2025 AWM-SIAM Sonia Kovalevsky Lecturer.

Zhang served on the Executive Council of USACM and the General Council of International Association for Computational Mechanics (IACM). In USACM, she chaired the Technical Thrust Area of Isogeometric Analysis and is the founding chair of the Female Researchers Group. She chaired the Executive Committee of SMA where she initialized the Advisory Board and launched two new awards to recognize outstanding junior and mid-career researchers: Young Investigator Award and SMA Fellow. In addition to the Editor-in-Chief of Engineering with Computers, she also serves on the editorial board or is an associate editor of several journals such as Computer Methods in Applied Mechanics and Engineering, Computer-Aided Design and Computer Aided Geometric Design. She also serves as the program director for the Society for Industrial and Applied Mathematics Activity Group on Geometric Design.

== Selected publications ==
=== Book ===
- Zhang, Yongjie Jessica (2016), Geometric Modeling and Mesh Generation from Scanned Images, CRC Press

=== Research papers ===
- Bazilevs, Y.; Calo, V. M.; Hughes, T. J. R.; Zhang, Y. (August 2008), "Isogeometric fluid-structure interaction: theory, algorithms, and computations", Computational Mechanics, 43 (1): 3–37, Bibcode:2008CompM..43....3B, doi:10.1007/s00466-008-0315-x, S2CID 122907287
- Liao, Tao; Li, Xinge; Xu, Guoliang; Zhang, Yongjie Jessica (January 2016), "Secondary Laplace operator and generalized Giaquinta–Hildebrandt operator with applications on surface segmentation and smoothing", Computer-Aided Design, 70: 56–66, doi:10.1016/j.cad.2015.07.009. Best paper at SPM 2015.
- Hu, Kangkang; Zhang, Yongjie Jessica; Xu, Guoliang (2017), "CVT-based 3D image segmentation for quality tetrahedral meshing", in Barneva, R.; Brimkov, V.; Tavares, J. (eds.), Computational Modeling of Objects Presented in Images. Fundamentals, Methods, and Applications: CompIMAGE 2016, Lecture Notes in Computer Science, vol. 10149, Cham: Springer, pp. 27–42, doi:10.1007/978-3-319-54609-4_2, ISBN 978-3-319-54608-7. Best paper at CompIMAGE 2016.
