= K-set (geometry) =

Points separated from others by a line

A set of six points (red), its six 2-sets (the sets of points contained in the blue ovals), and lines separating each $k$-set from the remaining points (dashed black).

In discrete geometry, a $k$-set of a finite point set $S$ in the Euclidean plane is a subset of $k$ elements of $S$ that can be strictly separated from the remaining points by a line. More generally, in Euclidean space of higher dimensions, a $k$-set of a finite point set is a subset of $k$ elements that can be separated from the remaining points by a hyperplane. In particular, when $k=n/2$ (where $n$ is the size of $S$), the line or hyperplane that separates a $k$-set from the rest of $S$ is a halving line or halving plane.

The $k$-sets of a set of points in the plane are related by projective duality to the $k$-levels in an arrangement of lines. The $k$-level in an arrangement of $n$ lines in the plane is the curve consisting of the points that lie on one of the lines and have exactly $k$ lines below them. Discrete and computational geometers have also studied levels in arrangements of more general kinds of curves and surfaces.

== Combinatorial bounds ==
It is of importance in the analysis of geometric algorithms to bound the number of $k$-sets of a planar point set, or equivalently the number of $k$-levels of a planar line arrangement, a problem first studied by Lovász and Erdős et al. The best known upper bound for this problem is $O(nk^{1/3})$, as was shown by Tamal Dey using the crossing number inequality of Ajtai, Chvátal, Newborn, and Szemerédi. However, the best known lower bound is far from Dey's upper bound: it is $\Omega(nc^{\sqrt{\log k}})$ for some constant $c$, as shown by Tóth.

In three dimensions, the best upper bound known is $O(nk^{3/2})$, and the best lower bound known is $\Omega(nkc^{\sqrt{\log k}})$. For points in three dimensions that are in convex position, that is, are the vertices of some convex polytope, the number of $k$-sets is $\Theta\bigl((n-k)k\bigr)$, which follows from arguments used for bounding the complexity of $k$th order Voronoi diagrams.

Bounds have also been proven on the number of $\le k$-sets, where a $\le k$-set is a $j$-set for some $j\le k$. In two dimensions, the maximum number of $\le k$-sets is exactly $nk$, while in $d$ dimensions the bound is $O(n^{\lfloor d/2\rfloor}k^{\lceil d/2\rceil})$.

== Halving lines ==
Unsolved problem in mathematics
What is the largest possible number of halving lines for a set of $n$ points in the plane?
More unsolved problems in mathematics

There are two separate but related ways in which halving lines are defined. The first simply separates half of the points of $S$ from the other. The second is similar, but each line must pass through 2 points in $S$, and equally bisect the remaining points. The different definitions directly translate to each other in the dual line arrangement, where halving lines become dual to points. This is because, given an alternating sequence of cells and crossings in the dual arrangement, there will always be exactly one more cell than crossing.

For the case when $k=n/2$ (halving lines), the maximum number $h_n$ of combinatorially distinct lines through two points of $S$ that bisect the remaining points when $k=1,2,\dots$ is

1,3,6,9,13,18,22... (sequence A076523 in the OEIS).

For odd $n$, rather than exactly bisecting the points, one half should have $\frac{n-1}{2}$ points and the other should have $\frac{n-3}{2}$. For even $n$, the current best upper bound is $h_n \le \left(29/8\right)^{\frac{1}{3}} n (n - 1)^{\frac{1}{3}}$.

A weaker case of halving pseudolines in the projective plane is also studied, acting on an arrangement of pseudolines rather than a line arrangement. This problem relies more on combinatorics and less on geometry, but results from the weaker case carry over whenever the arrangement is stretchable, that is, can have its pseudolines straightened into lines without changing their combinatorial properties.

A conjecture exists for the relationship between halving lines and the rectilinear crossing number $\overline{cr}(n)$ for a set of $n$ points, which states that, for each arrangement of points in which $\overline{cr}(n)$ is minimized, the number of halving lines is maximized. The opposite relation is known not to be true, as some arrangements of points which maximize the number of halving lines have a quadrilateral as a convex hull, while all arrangements maximizing $\overline{cr}(n)$ have a triangular convex hull.

== Construction algorithms ==
Edelsbrunner and Welzl first studied the problem of constructing all $k$-sets of an input point set, or dually of constructing the $k$-level of an arrangement. The $k$-level version of their algorithm can be viewed as a plane sweep algorithm that constructs the level in left-to-right order. Viewed in terms of $k$-sets of point sets, their algorithm maintains a dynamic convex hull for the points on each side of a separating line, repeatedly finds a bitangent of these two hulls, and moves each of the two points of tangency to the opposite hull. Chan surveys subsequent results on this problem, and shows that it can be solved in time proportional to Dey's $O(nk^{1/3})$ bound on the complexity of the $k$-level.

Agarwal and Matoušek describe algorithms for efficiently constructing an approximate level; that is, a curve that passes between the $(k-\delta)$-level and the $(k+\delta)$-level for some small approximation parameter $\delta$. They show that such an approximation can be found, consisting of a number of line segments that depends only on $n/\delta$ and not on $n$ or $k$.

== Matroid generalizations ==
The planar $k$-level problem can be generalized to one of parametric optimization in a matroid: one is given a matroid in which each element is weighted by a linear function of a parameter $\lambda$, and must find the minimum weight basis of the matroid for each possible value of $\lambda$. If one graphs the weight functions as lines in a plane, the $k$-level of the arrangement of these lines graphs as a function of $\lambda$ the weight of the largest element in an optimal basis in a uniform matroid, and Dey showed that his $O(nk^{1/3})$ bound on the complexity of the $k$-level could be generalized to count the number of distinct optimal bases of any matroid with $n$ elements and rank $k$.

For instance, the same $O(nk^{1/3})$ upper bound holds for counting the number of different minimum spanning trees formed in a graph with $n$ edges and $k$ vertices, when the edges have weights that vary linearly with a parameter $\lambda$. This parametric minimum spanning tree problem has been studied by various authors and can be used to solve other bicriterion spanning tree optimization problems.

However, the best known lower bound for the parametric minimum spanning tree problem is $\Omega(n\log k)$, a weaker bound than that for the $k$-set problem. For more general matroids, Dey's $O(nk^{1/3})$ upper bound has a matching lower bound.

== Examples of halving lines ==
2 points, 1 line

4 points, 3 lines

6 points, 6 lines

8 points, 9 lines
