= Klee diagram =

Visualization of genomic datasets

Klee diagrams, named for their resemblance to paintings by Paul Klee, are false-colour maps that represent a way of assembling and viewing large genomic datasets. Contemporary research has produced genomic databases for an enormous range of life forms, inviting insights into the genetic basis of biodiversity.

Indicator vectors are used to depict nucleotide sequences. This technique produces correlation matrices or Klee diagrams. Researchers Lawrence Sirovich, Mark Y. Stoeckle and Yu Zhang (2010) used their improved algorithm on a set of some 17000 DNA barcode sequences from 12 disparate animal taxa, finding that indicator vectors were a viable taxonomic tool, and that discontinuities corresponded with taxonomic divisions.
