= Hanani–Tutte theorem =

On parity of crossings in graph drawings

In topological graph theory, the Hanani–Tutte theorem is a result on the parity of edge crossings in a graph drawing. It states that every drawing in the plane of a non-planar graph contains a pair of independent edges (not both sharing an endpoint) that cross each other an odd number of times. Equivalently, it can be phrased as a planarity criterion: a graph is planar if and only if it has a drawing in which every pair of independent edges crosses evenly (or not at all).

== History ==
The result is named after Haim Hanani, who proved in 1934 that every drawing of the two minimal non-planar graphs K_{5} and K_{3,3} has a pair of edges with an odd number of crossings, and after W. T. Tutte, who stated the full theorem explicitly in 1970. A parallel development of similar ideas in algebraic topology has been credited to Egbert van Kampen, Arnold S. Shapiro, and Wu Wenjun.

== Applications ==
One consequence of the theorem is that testing whether a graph is planar may be formulated as solving a system of linear equations over the finite field of order two. These equations may be solved in polynomial time, but the resulting algorithms are less efficient than other known planarity tests.

== Generalizations ==
For other surfaces S than the plane, a graph can be drawn on S without crossings if and only if it can be drawn in such a way that all pairs of edges cross an even number of times; this is known as the weak Hanani–Tutte theorem for S. The strong Hanani–Tutte theorem states that a graph can be drawn without crossings on S if and only if it can be drawn in such a way that all independent pairs of edges cross an even number of times, without regard for the number of crossings between edges that share an endpoint; this strong version does not hold for all surfaces, but it is known to hold for the plane, the projective plane and the torus.

The same approach, in which one shows that pairs of edges with an even number of crossings can be disregarded or eliminated in some type of graph drawing and uses this fact to set up a system of linear equations describing the existence of a drawing, has been applied to several other graph drawing problems, including upward planar drawings, drawings minimizing the number of uncrossed edges, and clustered planarity.
