= Albertson conjecture =

Relation between graph coloring and crossings

Unsolved problem in mathematics
Do complete graphs have the smallest possible crossing number among graphs with the same chromatic number?
More unsolved problems in mathematics

The complete graph $K_6$ drawn with three crossings, the smallest crossing number of any graph requiring six colors

In combinatorial mathematics, the Albertson conjecture is an unproven relationship between the crossing number and the chromatic number of a graph. It is named after Michael O. Albertson, a professor at Smith College, who stated it as a conjecture in 2007; it is one of his many conjectures in graph coloring theory. The conjecture states that, among all graphs requiring $n$ colors, the complete graph $K_n$ is the one with the smallest crossing number. Equivalently, if a graph can be drawn with fewer crossings than $K_n$, then, according to the conjecture, it may be colored with fewer than $n$ colors.

== A conjectured formula for the minimum crossing number ==
It is straightforward to show that graphs with bounded crossing number have bounded chromatic number: one may assign distinct colors to the endpoints of all crossing edges and then 4-color the remaining planar graph. Albertson's conjecture replaces this qualitative relationship between crossing number and coloring by a more precise quantitative relationship. Specifically, a different conjecture of Richard K. Guy (1972) states that the crossing number of the complete graph $K_n$ is

$$\textrm{cr}(K_n)=\frac14\biggl\lfloor\frac{n}{2}\biggr\rfloor\left\lfloor\frac{n-1}{2}\right\rfloor\left\lfloor\frac{n-2}{2}\right\rfloor\left\lfloor\frac{n-3}{2}\right\rfloor.$$

It is known how to draw complete graphs with this many crossings, by placing the vertices in two concentric circles; what is unknown is whether there exists a better drawing with fewer crossings. Therefore, a strengthened formulation of the Albertson conjecture is that every $n$-chromatic graph has crossing number at least as large as the right hand side of this formula. This strengthened conjecture would be true if and only if both Guy's conjecture and the Albertson conjecture are true.

== Asymptotic bounds ==
A weaker form of the conjecture, proven by M. Schaefer, states that every graph with chromatic number $n$ has crossing number $\Omega(n^4)$ (using big omega notation), or equivalently that every graph with crossing number $k$ has chromatic number $O(k^{1/4})$. Albertson, Cranston & Fox (2009) published a simple proof of these bounds, by combining the fact that every minimal $n$-chromatic graph has minimum degree at least $n-1$ (because otherwise greedy coloring would use fewer colors) together with the crossing number inequality according to which every graph $G=(V,E)$ with $|E|/|V|\ge 4$ has crossing number $\Omega(|E|^3/|V|^2)$. Using the same reasoning, they show that a counterexample to Albertson's conjecture for the chromatic number $n$ (if it exists) must have fewer than $4n$ vertices.

== Special cases ==
The Albertson conjecture is vacuously true for $n\le 4$. In these cases, $K_n$ has crossing number zero, so the conjecture states only that the $n$-chromatic graphs have crossing number greater than or equal to zero, something that is true of all graphs. The case $n=5$ of Albertson's conjecture is equivalent to the four color theorem, that any planar graph can be colored with four or fewer colors, for the only graphs requiring fewer crossings than the one crossing of $K_5$ are the planar graphs, and the conjecture implies that these should all be at most 4-chromatic. Through the efforts of several groups of authors the conjecture is now known to hold for all $n\le 18$. For every integer $c\ge 6$, Luiz and Richter presented a family of $(c+1)$-color-critical graphs that do not contain a subdivision of the complete graph $K_{c+1}$ but have crossing number at least that of $K_{c+1}$.

== Related conjectures ==
There is also a connection to the Hadwiger conjecture, an important open problem in combinatorics concerning the relationship between chromatic number and the existence of large cliques as minors in a graph. A variant of the Hadwiger conjecture, stated by György Hajós, is that every $n$-chromatic graph contains a subdivision of $K_n$; if this were true, the Albertson conjecture would follow, because the crossing number of the whole graph is at least as large as the crossing number of any of its subdivisions. However, counterexamples to the Hajós conjecture are now known, so this connection does not provide an avenue for proof of the Albertson conjecture.
