= Tamal Dey =

Indian mathematician and computer scientist (born 1964)

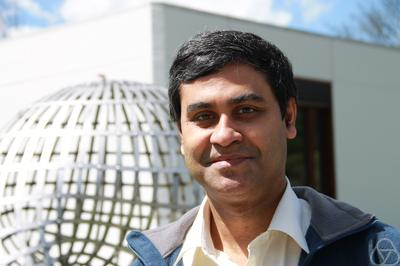
Tamal K. Dey at the MFO, 2012

Tamal Krishna Dey (born 1964) is an Indian mathematician and computer scientist specializing in computational geometry and computational topology. He is a professor at Purdue University.

== Education and career ==
Dey graduated from Jadavpur University in 1985, with a bachelor's degree in electronics. He earned a master's degree from the Indian Institute of Science Bangalore in 1987, and completed his Ph.D. at Purdue University in 1991. His dissertation, Decompositions of Polyhedra in Three Dimensions, was supervised by Chandrajit Bajaj.

After postdoctoral research with Herbert Edelsbrunner at the University of Illinois at Urbana–Champaign, Dey joined the Purdue faculty in 1992. He moved to the Indian Institute of Technology Kharagpur in 1994, and moved to the computer science and engineering department at Ohio State University in 1999. At Ohio State, he obtained a courtesy appointment in the department of mathematics in 2015. He became the interim chair of the computer science department at Ohio State in 2019, before moving to Purdue in 2020.

== Contributions ==
Dey is known for proving the tightest-known upper bounds on the k-set problem and for his work on 3D reconstruction and computational topology.

He is the author of the book Curve and Surface Reconstruction: Algorithms with Mathematical Analysis (Cambridge University Press, 2006). With Siu-Wing Cheng and Jonathan Shewchuk, he is the co-author of Delaunay Mesh Generation (CRC Press, 2012).

== Recognition ==
Dey was elected as an ACM Fellow in 2018 for "contributions to computational geometry and computational topology". He is also a fellow of the IEEE, and was named as a fellow of the Solid Modeling Association in 2019.
