= Taiwan and international organizations =

Prior to 1971, the flag of the Republic of China was used by the ROC government to represent the Chinese state on the international stage

Flag of Chinese Taipei in the official Olympic Games

Chinese Taipei Deaflympic flag

Chinese Taipei Paralympic flag

Chinese Taipei Universiade flag

Taiwan (officially the Republic of China) participates in a number of international organizations. Under pressure from the People's Republic of China (PRC, commonly known as "China"), the ROC has been excluded from, or downgraded in, many international organizations. In other cases, Taiwan may retain full participation, either as Taiwan, the Republic of China, or due to the usage of names such as "Chinese Taipei."

== Use of name ==
- Participated in 37 intergovernmental international organizations with the name "Chinese Taipei".
- Participated in 8 intergovernmental international organizations with the name "Republic of China".
- Participated in 6 intergovernmental international organizations with the name "Taiwan".
- Participated in 6 intergovernmental international organizations with the name "Taiwan (ROC)".
- Participated in 5 intergovernmental international organizations with the name "Chinese Taipei".

Below is a list of such international organizations with the name by which Taiwan is known in each:

- Academic Council of the United Nations System (ACUNS) (participates as "Taipei Economic and Cultural Office in New York")
- Association of Asia Pacific Airlines (AAPA) (included as Member Airlines)
- Afro-Asian Rural Development Organization (AARDO) (participates as "Republic of China (Taiwan)")
- Agency for International Trade Information and Cooperation (AITIC) (participates as "Separate Customs Territory of Taiwan, Penghu, Kinmen, and Matsu")
- Amnesty International (AI) (participates as "Taiwan", ROC's Legislative Yuan debated and ratified the International Covenant on Civil and Political Rights and the International Covenant on Economic, Social and Cultural Rights on 31 March 2009.)
- Asia Council (covered as "Taiwan")
- Asian Federation of Biotechnology (AFOB) (participates as Biochemical Engineering Society of Taiwan (BEST))
- Asia Indigenous Peoples Pact (AIPP) (NGO in Special Consultative Status with the United Nations Economic and Social Council, participates as Taiwan)
- Asia News Network (ANN) (participates as The China Post)
- Asia-Pacific Association of Agricultural Research Institutions (APAARI) (participates by Council of Agriculture)
- Asia/Pacific Group on Money Laundering (APG) (participates as Chinese Taipei)
- Asia Pacific Regional Internet Conference on Operational Technologies (APRICOT) (participates as the economy of Taiwan)
- Asian and Oceanian Stock Exchanges Federation (AOSEF) (participates as "Taiwan Stock Exchange Corp.")
- Asian Forum for Human Rights and Development (FORUM-ASIA) (participates by Taiwan Association for Human Rights)
- Asian Network of Major Cities 21 (ANMC21) (participates as Taipei City)
- Association of Asian Social Science Research Councils (AASSREC)(participates as associate member of Academia Sinica – Taipei)
- Association for Computing Machinery (ACM) (presents the Turing Award, participates as "Taiwan")
- Association for Financial Professionals (AFP) (provide country-specific information as "Taiwan")
- Association of Future Markets (AFM) (participates as "Taiwan Futures Exchange" (TAIFEX))
- Association Montessori Internationale (AMI) (officially participates as "Taiwan/China", according to UN's definition of the territory of Taiwan and Taiwan, province of China, which is separated from China)
- Association of Southeast Asian Nations (ASEAN) (referred to as "Taiwan (ROC)")
- Asian Productivity Organization (APO) (participates as Republic of China)
- Asia-Pacific Economic Cooperation (APEC) (on the basis of the Memorandum of Understanding of 1991 and partaking APEC Business Travel Card scheme) (participates as "Chinese Taipei")
- Asian Development Bank (ADB) (participates as "Taipei,China") (Note: Joined as the Republic of China representing not only Taiwan Area, but also nominally Mainland China until 1986. However, its share of Bank capital was based on the size of Taiwan's capital, unlike the World Bank and IMF where the government in Taiwan had had a share. The representation was succeeded by the People's Republic of China in 1986. However, the ROC was allowed to retain its membership, but under the name of "Taipei,China" (space deliberately omitted after the comma) – a name it protests. Uniquely, this allows both sides of the Taiwan Straits to be represented at the institution.)
- Asian Development Bank Institute (ADBI) (located in the Kasumigaseki Building, participates as Taipei, China)
- Association for Information Systems (AIS) (participates as "Taiwan")
- Association of Asian Election Authorities (AAEA) (participates as Republic of China (Taiwan))
- Asia-Pacific Network Information Centre (APNIC) (participates as the economy of Taiwan by Taiwan Network Information Center)
- Asian-Pacific Parliamentarians' Union (APPU) (held the 16th and 40th plenary meeting, participates as Republic of China)
- Bank for International Settlements (BIS) (referred to as "Taiwan")
- Belmont Forum (Belmont Forum is a member of the Science and Technology Alliance for Global Sustainability, engaged by Ministry of Science and Technology (Taiwan))
- Botanic Gardens Conservation International (BGCI) (participates as "Taiwan")
- Boao Forum for Asia (BFA) (participates as "Cross-Straits Common Market Foundation")
- Banco Centralamericano de Integración Economico (BCIE or CABEI) (participates as Republic of China)
- British Council (administers international distance education exams and professional exams and on behalf of other international exam boards in Taiwan)
- Caribbean Community (CARICOM) (with Member States of Belize, Haiti, Saint Kitts and Nevis, Saint Lucia and Saint Vincent and the Grenadines recognising Republic of China)
- Centre for Energy Environment Resources Development (CEERD) (in contact with as "Chinese Taipei")
- Conservation International (CI) (listed in the annual Ocean Health Index)
- Consumers International (CI) (participates as "Consumers Foundation Chinese Taipei")
- Council for Security Cooperation in the Asia Pacific (CSCAP) (participates as "participant with individual capacity" in this "Track Two of Asia-Pacific Diplomacy")
- Council on Tall Buildings and Urban Habitat (CTBUH) (participates as Taiwan, China)
- Citizen Cyberscience Centre (CCC) (founded by United Nations Institute for Training and Research, participates by Academia Sinica)
- Cumulus (recognised by UNESCO since 2011, participates as Taiwan(China))
- Education International (EI) (participates as Taiwan)
- Egmont Group of Financial Intelligence Units (participates as "Taiwan")
- European Bank for Reconstruction and Development (EBRD) (has a long-standing cooperation with the EBRD as "Taipei China")
- European Patent Office (EPO) (included in the Asian Patent Information as Chinese Taipei)
- European Organization for Nuclear Research (CERN) (has scientific contacts as China (Taipei))
- Food and Fertilizer Technology Center (FFTC) (participates as "Taiwan")
- Free Access to Law Movement (FALM) (participates as Taiwan Legal Information Institute)
- European Pharmacopoeia (participates as an observer by Taiwan Food and Drug Administration (TFDA) of the Ministry of Health and Welfare (Republic of China))
- European Research Council (ERC) (a member of National Contact Points of ERC funding opportunities, participates as Taiwan)
- European Southern Observatory (ESO) (participates the Atacama Large Millimeter Array/submillimeter Array (ALMA) project by Academia Sinica (AS) in Taiwan, and the National Science Council of Taiwan (NSC) (now (Ministry of Science and Technology (Republic of China))))
- Fairtrade Labelling Organizations International (FLO) (participates as Fairtrade Taipei City)
- Fédération Internationale de Philatélie (FIP) (in partnership with United Nations Postal Administration and Universal Postal Union, participates as Chinese Taipei)
- Food and Agriculture Organization (FAO) (due to PRC's political pressure, participates in various subsidiary organizations as "China – Taipei", including Asia-Pacific Association of Agricultural Research Institutions, International Commission on Irrigation and Drainage, Asia and Pacific Seed Association)
- FIABCI (participates as "Chinese Taiwan")
- FreedomInfo.org (links the efforts of freedom of information advocates globally, included as Taiwan)
- Freemasonry (participates as Grand Lodge of China)
- Institute of International Education (IIE) (participates through the Fulbright program of Council for International Exchange of Scholars as Taiwan (Republic of China))
- International Basketball Federation (FIBA) (participates as Chinese Taipei)
- Fédération Internationale de Football Association (FIFA) (participates as Chinese Taipei)
- Human Rights Watch (HRW) (involved as "Taiwan")
- IFEX (spotlighted as Taiwan)
- International Association of Horticultural Producers (AIPH) (participates as Chinese Taipei)
- International Association of Public Transport (UITP) (participates as "Taiwan")
- International Atomic Energy Agency (IAEA) (signed a trilateral agreement with the United States and the IAEA in 1971 stating that ROC continue to abide by the terms of the Treaty on the Non-Proliferation of Nuclear Weapons. While not a member of the IAEA, Taiwan does continue to subscribe to the IAEA's safeguards under two agreements, INFCIRC/133 and INFCIRC/158.)
- International Association of Judges (IAJ) (as a professional and non-political international organization, that the association has consultative status with the United Nations (namely the International Labour Office and the U.N. Economic and Social Council) and with the Council of Europe, participates as "Republic of China (Taiwan)")
- International Air Transport Association (IATA)(included as Taiwan/Chinese Taipei)
- International Bar Association (IBA) (participates section-ally as "Taiwan")
- International Baccalaureate (IB) (There are 4 IB World Schools in Taiwan offering one or more of the three IB programmes; however, there currently there are no universities in Taiwan recognising IB.)
- International Business Innovation Association (IBIA) (participates by Institute for Information Industry)
- International Campaign to Ban Landmines (ICBL) (included as Taiwan CBL)
- International Chamber of Commerce (ICC) (ICC participates in the activities of UNCTAD, including International Court of Arbitration, participates as Chinese Taipei)
- International Commission of Jurists (ICJ) (affiliates by the Taipei Bar Association)
- International Competition Network (ICN) (participates as Taiwan Fair Trade Commission)
- International Congress and Convention Association (ICCA) (participates as Chinese Taipei)
- International Council of Museums (ICM) (participates as Taiwan in the Board of ICM)
- International Cospas-Sarsat Programme (Cospas-Sarsat) (participates as International Telecommunication Development Company (Chinese Taipei) (ITDC))
- International Council on Social Welfare (ICSW) (participates as "Taiwan" in the ICSW North East Asia Region)
- International Council of Women (ICW) (participates as Taiwan, Republic of China)
- International Association for the Evaluation of Educational Achievement (IEA) (originally associated from the UNESCO, participates as "Chinese Taipei".)
- International Council for Information Technology in Government Administration (ICA) (participates as "Taiwan")
- International Council for Science (ICSU) (participates as China: Taipei, Academy of Sciences located in Taipei)
- International Council of Graphic Design Associations (Icograda) (with international alliances of ISO, UNESCO's Global Alliance for Cultural Diversity, UNIDO and WIPO, participates as Taiwan (Chinese Taipei))
- International Council of Societies of Industrial Design (ICSID) (participates as Taiwan (Chinese Taipei))
- International Democrat Union (IDU) (participates as "Taiwan")
- International Energy Agency (IEA) (included as a non-member country as "Chinese Taipei")
- International Federation of Reproduction Rights Organization (IFRRO) (participates as Chinese Oral & Literary Copyright Collective Management Association)
- International Institute of Administrative Sciences (IIAS) (participates as "Taiwan, China")
- International Institute for Democracy and Electoral Assistance (International IDEA) (listed in the voter turnout data as Taiwan)
- International Renewable Energy Agency (IREA) (referred to as "Taiwan" as IREA is co-hosted in the Steering Committee in the REN21)
- International Press Institute(IPI)(participates as Taiwan (ROC))
- Institute of Electrical and Electronics Engineers (IEEE) (participates as "IEEE Taipei Section" and "IEEE Tainan Section")
- Institute of International Finance (IIF) (participates as Mega International Commercial Bank, "Taiwan, China")
- International Federation of Agricultural Producers (IFAP) (participates as "Taiwan Provincial Farmers Association")
- International Federation for Human Rights (FIDH) (participates as "Taiwan")
- International Federation of Journalists (IFJ) (participates as "Taiwan")
- International Labour Organization (ILO) (referred to as "Taiwan, Province of China")
- International Life Saving Federation (ILSF) (referred to as "Taiwan, China")
- International Maritime Organization (IMO) (referred to as "Taiwan, Province of China")
- International Monetary Fund (IMF) (referred to as "Taiwan Province of China" and enhances ROC's sovereignty by indirectly channeling IMF through the Special Exchange Rate Agreement signed with the WTO)
- International Network for Quality Assurance Agencies in Higher Education (INQAAHE) (participates as observer as "Taiwan")
- International Narcotics Control Board (INCB) (referred to as "Taiwan Province of China")
- International Olympic Committee (IOC) (participates as "Chinese Taipei" and bid for 2019 Asian Games by the Taipei City Government)
- International Committee of the Red Cross (ICRC) remains unofficial relations with the ICRC and referred as the "Taiwan Red Cross Organization" under the category of Public Sources.
- International Federation of Audit Bureaux of Circulations (IFABC) (participates as "Chinese Taipei")
- International Institute of Business Analysis (IIBA) (Endorsed Education Provided by Maestro Project Management Consultants Co., Ltd)
- International Law Association (ILA) (participates as "Chinese (Taiwan) branch")
- International Police Association (IPA) (Invited to join as Foreign Associate Members (FAMs))
- International Police Executive Symposium (IPES) (IPES is in special consultative status by the United Nations, contains World Police Encyclopedia, assigned as "Taiwan")
- InterAcademy Panel (IAP) (participates as Academia Sinica, Taipei, China)
- International Social Security Association (ISSA) (participates as "Taiwan")
- International Telecommunication Union (ITU) (included in the National Numbering Plan as "Taiwan, China")
- International Trade Centre (ITC) (participates as "Chinese Taipei")
- International Trade Union Confederation (ITUC) (participates as Taiwan)
- International Transport Workers' Federation (ITF) (participates as Taiwan)
- International Union of Railways (UIC) (participates as "Taiwan (China)")
- International Union of Forest Research Organizations (IUFRO) (participates as "China -Taipei")
- Internet Society(ISoc)(participates as ISOC Taiwan Chapter)
- International Organization of Securities Commissions(IOSCO)(works intensively with the G20 and the Financial Stability Board (FSB) on the global regulatory reform agenda, participates as Affiliate Members of IOSCO as Chinese Taipei)
- International Union of Pure and Applied Physics(IUPAP)(participates as China: The Physical Society located in Taipei)
- League of Historical Cities (participates as Tainan, "Chinese Taipei")
- London Metal Exchange (LME) (the largest metal stock exchange in the world, approved Kaohsiung, Taiwan as a good delivery point for primary aluminium, aluminium alloy, copper, lead, nickel, tin and zinc and as the LME's ninth location in Asia on 17 June 2013.)
- National Aeronautics and Space Administration (NASA) (participates as National Space Organization)
- North Atlantic Treaty Organization (NATO) (referred to as "Taiwan")
- North Pacific Fisheries Commission (NPFC) (participates as "Chinese Taipei" as a fishing entity)
- Organisation for Economic Co-operation and Development (OECD) (participates as "Chinese Taipei" as an observer)
- Organization of the Petroleum Exporting Countries (OPEC) (listed by economic cooperation as "Taiwan")
- Pacific Islands Forum (PIF) (conducts regular dialogue as Taiwan/ROC Forum countries dialogue and issues diplomatic Joint Statement at each dialogue conference)
- Pacific Economic Cooperation Council (PECC) (participates as "Chinese Taipei")
- Property Rights Alliance (PRA) (indexed as Taiwan)
- Public Services International (PSI) (participates as Taiwan)
- Regional Fisheries Management Organisation (RFMOs) (participates as a fishing entity on the basis of United Nations Fish Stocks Agreement)
- Reporters Without Borders (RWB) (included as "Taiwan" and first Asian Bureau opened in 2017 by RWB in Taipei City)
- Sistema de Integración Centroamericana (SICA) (participates as Republic of China as the Extra-regional Observer)
- Sustainable Development Goals (SDGs) (to replace the UN Millennium Development Goals once they expire at the end of 2015, included as Taiwan in the World Happiness Report of United Nations Sustainable Development Solutions Network)
- SEACEN (participates as Central Bank, "Chinese Taipei")
- Seoul Accord (participates as IEET(Chinese Taipei))
- South East Asia Regional Computer Confederation (SEARCC) (SEARCC is an affiliate member of the International Federation for Information Processing, participates as Taiwan-Computer Society of Republic of China)
- Study Group on Asian Tax Administration and Research (SGATAR) (participates as Chinese Taipei)
- Summit for Democracy (participates as Taiwan)
- Transparency International (TI) (to lend impetus on the formation of United Nations Convention against Corruption and OECD Anti-Bribery Convention, participates as "Chinese Taipei")
- United Nations Academic Impact (UNAI) (participates as "China")
- United Nations Children's Fund (UNICEF) (referred to as "Taiwan")
- United Nations Commission on International Trade Law (UNCITRAL) (to be considered separately from PRC, but has not attained neither CISG status nor Model Law status
- United Nations Conference on Trade and Development (UNCTAD) (referred to as "Taiwan Province of China")
- United Nations Department of Economic and Social Affairs (UN/DESA) (assorted as "Taiwan Province of China")
- United Nations Economic and Social Commission for Asia and the Pacific (UNESCAP) (over-sighted as "Taiwan Province of China")
- United Nations Human Settlements Programme (UN–HABITAT) (included as "Taiwan Province of China")
- United Nations Industrial Development Organization (UNIDO) (referred to as "Taiwan Province of China")
- United Nations Institute for Disarmament Research (UNIDIR) (researched and referred as "Taiwan")
- United Nations International Strategy for Disaster Reduction (UNISDR) (covered as Taiwan (China))
- United Nations Office on Drugs and Crime (UNODC) (referred to as "Taiwan Province of China")
- United Nations Research Institute for Social Development (UNRISD) (researched as "Taiwan Province of China")
- United Nations Statistics Division (UNSD) (referred to as Taiwan, province of China)
- Universal Postal Union (UPU) (removed and excluded by UPU in 1972; "Taiwan's" Chunghwa Post continually providing the postal services as a non-recognised postal entity)
- Unrepresented Nations and Peoples Organization (UNPO) (participates as "Taiwan")
- Washington Accord (International Engineering Alliance) (participates as Chinese Taipei)
- World Association of Girl Guides and Girl Scouts (WAGGGS) (participates as "Taiwan", also note that there is no national member of WAGGGS in PRC)
- World Bank (WB) (covered separately in the Private Sector section, included as the economy of Taiwan, China)
- World Confederation of Labour (WCL) (participates as "Taiwan")
- World Economic Forum (WEF) (officially listed as "Taiwan, China")
- World Energy Council (WEC) (participates as "Taiwan, China")
- World Federation of Exchanges (WFE) (participates as "Taiwan Stock Exchange" and "Taiwan Futures Exchange") Under the umbrella of World Federation of Exchanges, MSCI includes Taiwan as MSCI Taiwan Index. In addition, London Metal Exchange is participated under London Stock Exchange in association with the World Federation of Exchanges in relation with Taiwan Future Exchange.
- World Health Organization (WHO) (In the outbreak of Severe acute respiratory syndrome and with the concern of Disease surveillance, was invited as "Chinese Taipei" on the case-by-case basis. with its relations with the WHO being governed by a Memorandum of Understanding dated 14 May 2005 between the PRC and the WHO. The health insurance scheme in Taiwan is referenced on the WHO publication. Chinese Taipei is invited as an observer status in the World Health Assembly on the basis of Resolution 2758 and the condition of Cross-Strait relations. On 21 May 2018, 15 out of the 18 UN member states which then recognised the ROC (thus excluding Guatemala, Honduras and Palau) voiced support for the WHA observer status. This included Burkina Faso, which cut ties with the ROC only three days later, establishing ties with the PRC instead.
- Worldwatch Institute (WI) (in partnership as Taiwan Watch)
- World Intellectual Property Organization (WIPO) (not a signatory of the Patent Cooperation Treaty and Paris Convention for the Protection of Industrial Property, referred to as "Taiwan, Province of China")
- World Medical Association (WMA) (participates as "Taiwan" by the Taiwan Medical Association)
- World Meteorological Organization (WMO) (signed and ratified the Convention of the World Meteorological Organization on 2 March 1951, cited as "Taiwan region")
- World Organisation for Animal Health (OIE) (participates as "Taipei (Chinese)")
- World Organization of the Scout Movement (WOSM) (participates as "Scouts of China")
- World Tax (founded by Euromoney Institutional Investor PLC, participates as "Taiwan")
- World Trade Centers Association (WTCA) (participates as World Trade Center Taipei, World Trade Center Taichung and World Trade Center Kaohsiung)
- World Trade Organization (WTO) (full membership as "Separate Customs Territory of Taiwan, Penghu, Kinmen, and Matsu" (Chinese Taipei) and delegated by the Permanent Mission of the Separate Customs Territory of Taiwan, Penghu, Kinmen and Mastu to the WTO in Geneva.)
- World Veterans Federation (WVF) (participates as "R.O.C. on Taiwan")

== United Nations ==
Taiwan, officially known as the Republic of China, has not been a charter member of the United Nations (UN) since 1971. Historically, the Republic of China joined the United Nations as a founding member and was one of five permanent members of the Security Council until the People's Republic of China took the Chinese seat in 1971.

In recent years, Taiwan has sought to participate in the UN System in different forms, either as an observer in specialized agencies or as a formal member. Despite support from diplomatic allies and the United States, Taiwan's participation in the UN System has largely been denied or limited due to pressure from China.

== World Health Organization ==
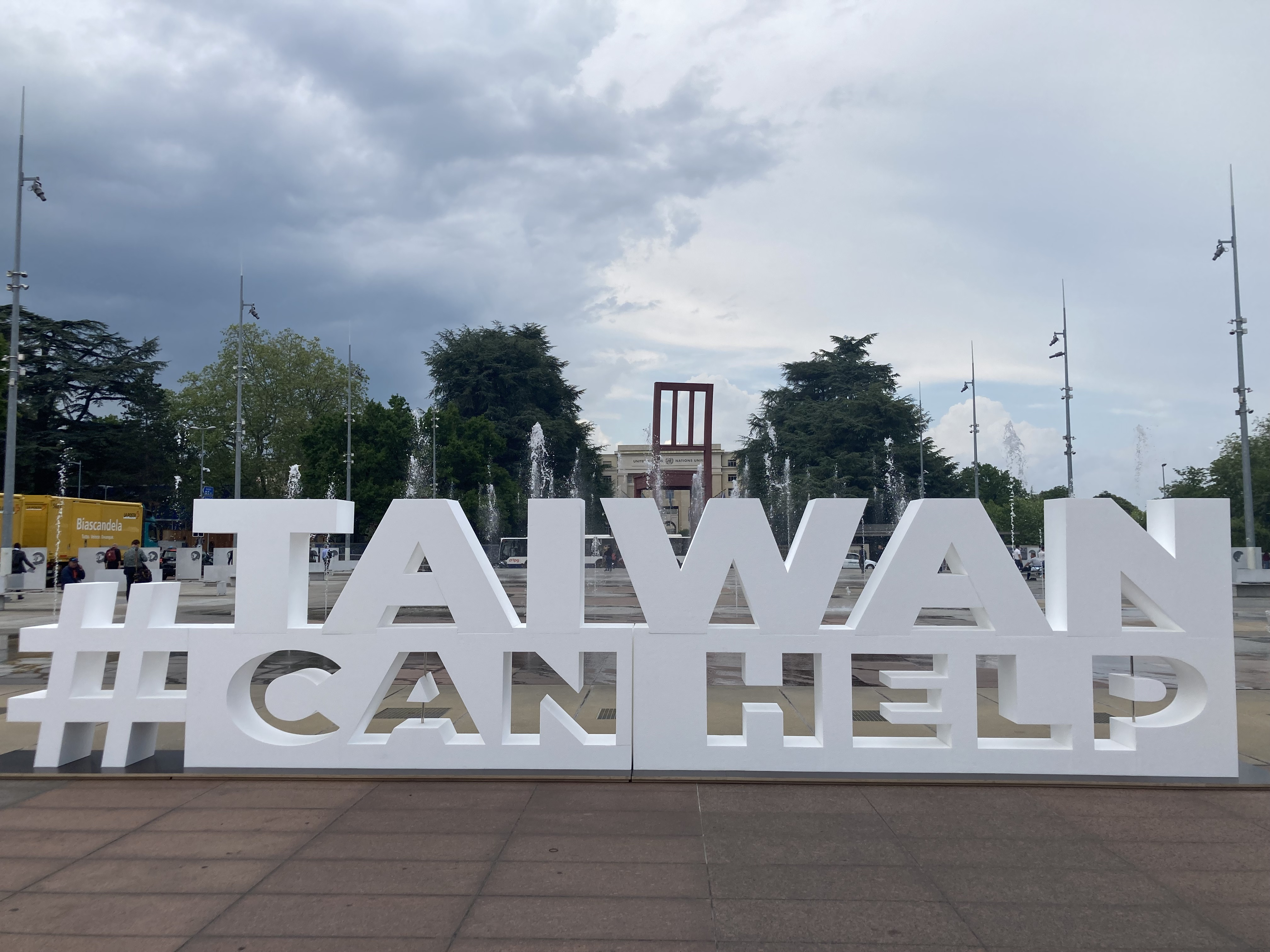
"#TaiwanCanHelp" installation art displayed in front of the Palace of Nations in Geneva during the 2023 World Health Assembly

Taiwan and the World Health Organization (WHO) have a complicated history due to their relationship with China.

== European Union ==
Taiwan–European Union relations are the international relations between Taiwan (officially the Republic of China) and the European Union (EU), which are informed by their shared democratic tradition and close high-tech economic ties. The EU manages the European Economic and Trade Office in Taiwan, while the ROC operates the Taipei Representative Office in the EU and Belgium in Brussels. All EU member states recognize the People's Republic of China (PRC) as the sole sovereign state under the name 'China'.

While historically economic relations have been significant, they were often overshadowed by the EU's relations with larger trading partners like Japan and the United States. More recently, relations with Taiwan have been overshadowed by economic opportunities in China. In the early 2020s, Taiwan-Europe relations have reached a new momentum, with the volume of engagement increasing fivefold, driven largely by countries like Germany, France, Czechia, Lithiuania, and Poland.
