= Taiwan–European Union relations =

- European Union: Taiwan

Diplomatic mission
- European Economic and Trade Office, Taipei: Taipei Representative Office, Brussels

Envoy
- Head of Office Lutz Güllner: Representative Shieh Jhy-wey

Taiwan–European Union relations are the international relations between Taiwan (officially the Republic of China) and the European Union (EU), which are informed by their shared democratic tradition and close high-tech economic ties. The EU manages the European Economic and Trade Office in Taiwan, while the ROC operates the Taipei Representative Office in the EU and Belgium in Brussels. All EU member states recognize the People's Republic of China (PRC) as the sole sovereign state under the name 'China'.

While historically economic relations have been significant, they were often overshadowed by the EU's relations with larger trading partners like Japan and the United States. More recently, relations with Taiwan have been overshadowed by economic opportunities in China. In the early 2020s, Taiwan-Europe relations have reached a new momentum, with the volume of engagement increasing fivefold, driven largely by countries like Germany, France, Czechia, Lithiuania, and Poland.

== History ==
=== 2000s ===
In 2001, the European Commission referred Taiwan as a "separate customs territory, but not as a sovereign state", highlighting the role of Taiwan as autonomous economic entity for the purposes of the establishment of relations with the European Union.

In 2009 there were more than 30,000 Taiwanese students studying in Europe. Also in 2009 the EU opened a European Union Centre in Taiwan.

=== 2010s ===
Filip Grzegorzewski took over as the chief of the European Economic and Trade Office in Taiwan in September 2019.

=== 2020s ===
In April 2020 European Commission President Ursula von der Leyen tweeted her appreciation for Taiwan's donation of 5.6 million masks to EU countries to help fight the COVID-19 outbreak.

In December 2020 European Parliament vice president Nicola Beer announced her intention to visit Taiwan as soon as the global COVID-19 pandemic allowed.

In January 2021, the European Parliament passed two Taiwan related resolutions. Within, the EU Parliament affirmed that "the Union will remain vigilant regarding the situation in Taiwan and the upgrading of political and trade relations between the EU and the Republic of China (Taiwan)". The Parliament called "for the EU and its Member States to revisit their engagement policy with Taiwan." In addition, the EU Parliament here advocated Taiwan's continued and increased participation in international organizations. It also acknowledged and criticized the increased military provocation by the People's Republic of China in and around Taiwanese territory. The EU Parliament called for the status quo of Taiwan's de facto independence not to be changed unilaterally. In this context, the resolution also included a warning "against Chinese efforts towards stronger power projection in the region."

In September 2021, MEPs from the European Parliament Committee on Foreign Affairs prepared a report vowing for closer relations and a stronger partnership vis-à-vis Taiwan, while hailing Taiwan as a key EU partner and showing grave concern for Chinese military pressure waged against the island.

In November 2021 a European Parliament delegation composed of members of the Special Committee on Foreign Interference and Disinformation (INGE) visited Taiwan.

In December 2021 the EU representative office in Taiwan launched a series of short cooking movies on YouTube called "Taste of Europe" to introduce regional European cuisine to Taiwanese citizens.

In July 2022, the new EU ambassador to China Jorge Toledo Albiñana said that the EU does not support Taiwan independence, but “peaceful reunification”, adding: “We believe that there should be only one China, but in the event of a military invasion we have made it very clear that the EU, with the United States and its allies, will impose similar or even greater measures than we have now taken against Russia.”

In June 2023 a delegation of seven members of the European Parliament headed by Rasa Juknevičienė visited Taiwan and met with leaders including President Tsai.

In November 2024, President Lai Ching-te called for an economic partnership agreement with the EU, highlighting the potential for enhanced cooperation in semiconductors and other sectors like AI. While the EU has not committed to signing a formal agreement with Taiwan, it continues to recognize Taiwan as a trusted partner, particularly in the areas of economic security and trade.

According to the think tank Central European Institute of Asian Studies, the approaches of EU member states towards Taiwan can be categorized into four distinct categories:

Old Partners
France, Germany (also UK)
New Friends
Czechia, Lithiuania, Poland
Pragmatists
Austria, Belgium, Denmark, Finland, Hungary, Italy, Luxembourg, the Netherlands, Slovakia, Spain, Sweden (also Switzerland)
Laggards
Bulgaria, Croatia, Cyprus, Estonia, Greece, Ireland, Latvia, Portugal, Romania, Slovenia (also Norway)

In April 2026, the German and Czech governments denied requests for Taiwan to let President Lai Ching-te to fly through German and Czech airspace en route to a potential visit to Eswatini.

== Economic relations ==
Over the last two decades, and especially during the presidency of Tsai Ing-wen, EU-Taiwan economic relations have been deepened considerably.

In 2003, the "European Economic and Trade Office" was opened by the European Commission in Taipei with the goal to promote economic relations and improve bilateral trade and investment with Taiwan.

One of the most important steps in the development of the economic relations between Taiwan and the EU was the inclusion of Taiwan in the European Commission's trade and investment strategy "Trade for All" as part of its Asia-Pacific strategy in October 2015, in which the EU announced that it "will explore launching negotiations on investment with Taiwan".

The European Economic and Trade Office put in place several initiatives to further business collaboration with Taiwan such as the EU Investment Forum held annually since 2019 that allows Taiwanese enterprises to discover new investment opportunities in the EU and the EU-financed European Business and Regulatory Cooperation (EBRC) program created in 2014 specifically for Taiwan with the aim of enhancing regulatory cooperation between the EU and Taiwan by funding multiple trade-related events and projects in Taiwan intending to facilitate regulatory coherence and business collaboration.

Over the past several years, the EU and Taiwan have set up several dialogue platforms in order to deepen and enhance cooperation in economy, trade and industrial investment, with the most important ones being the Trade and Investment Dialogue (TID) which has been regularly held since 2021 and the Industrial Policy Dialogue (IPD) which has been held annually since 2015.

Since 1981 there have been annual trade consultations which were upgraded to the Trade and Investment Dialogue in 2021. The Trade and Investment Dialogue had always been co-chaired by the Deputy Minister of Taiwan's Ministry of Economic Affairs and by the Deputy Director-General of the European Commission's Trade Department until it was upgraded to the ministerial and director-general level in June 2022, demonstrating both the ambition of both sides to strengthen and deepen their economic relations and the growing importance of EU-Taiwan relations. In April 2023, during the second dialogue that was held on the minister and director-general level, the main topics of discussion were strategic cooperation and security-related aspects of trade and investment, offshore wind, agri-food and digital trade facilitation measures.

The EU-Taiwan Industrial Policy Dialogue was created to facilitate and enhance exchanges on industrial policies and to strengthen industrial cooperation. Another important step in the enhancement of industrial collaboration was the signing by Taiwan and the EU in 2018 of the EU-Taiwan Industrial Cooperation Agreement with the objective to further cooperation between small and medium-sized enterprises (SMEs). In 2023, the main topics of the 9th EU-Taiwan Industrial Dialogue included robotics, research and development collaboration, industrial policy and supply chain resilience.

Apart from these two EU-Taiwan economic cooperation platforms, the European Commission also regularly holds the European Innovation Week in Taiwan to improve and promote cooperation between European and Taiwanese enterprises, industrial clusters as well as scientific institutions.

In recent years, Taiwan's hold in technology has made it a major hub for European high-tech companies, and made it a vital economic partner, particularly in 5G and semiconductors. Taiwan plays a pivotal role in the global semiconductor supply chain, producing 60 percent of the world's semiconductors and ~90 percent of the advanced ones.

Taiwan's President Lai Ching-te attended the 2024 EU Investment Forum held on November 18 in Taipei, underlining the growing importance of Taiwan-EU economic cooperation. He stated that Taiwan will work to further expand economic cooperation with the EU and pointed out the potential of establishing an institutional basis for further cooperation through the signing of an Economic Partnership Agreement (EPA) between Taiwan and the EU, namely in enhancing cooperation in semiconductors, AI, digital technology, environmental protection and green energy as well as in establishing more resilient and secure global supply chains.

=== Bilateral trade ===
Over the last decade, bilateral trade between Taiwan and the EU has grown significantly. Between 2020 and 2023, bilateral trade between the EU and Taiwan has increased by 42 percent. In 2023, Taiwan was the EU's 13th biggest trading partner in the world and its 5th largest trading partner in Asia in terms of bilateral trade in goods while the EU was Taiwan's 4th biggest trading partner after China, the US and Japan. In 2023, Taiwan's trade in goods with the EU amounted to €77.7 billion, with EU exports to Taiwan totaling €30.5 billion (making the EU Taiwan's 4th largest import partner) and EU imports from Taiwan reaching €47.8 billion (making the EU Taiwan's 3rd biggest export partner) which resulted in a trade deficit of €17.3 billion with Taiwan.

The main exporting goods from Taiwan to the EU consist of information and communication technology products such as integrated circuits which made up 23% of total EU imports from Taiwan in 2023, computers and parts thereof accounting for 21% of total EU imports and telecommunication equipment of which phones made up 7% of total EU imports. The most important exporting items from the EU to Taiwan are semiconductor processing equipment which made up 21% of total EU goods exports in 2023, vehicles (12%), integrated circuits (10%) and pharmaceuticals (6%).

=== Bilateral investment ===
Bilateral investment between Taiwan and the EU has steadily grown in importance since the mid-twentieth century. Between 1952 and 2023, Foreign Direct Investment (FDI) from the EU to Taiwan totaled €53 billion, which led to the EU nowadays being Taiwan's most important foreign investor, while Taiwan's FDI to the EU amounted to €12.5 billion.

During the presidency of Tsai Ing-wen (2016–2024), Taiwan's investment in the EU has increased significantly by multiplying tenfold and thus amounting to around €10 billion while the EU's investment in Taiwan reached around €30 billion. In 2023, EU companies have invested €2.91 billion in Taiwan, while Taiwanese enterprises have invested around €4.6 billion in the EU so that Taiwan's total investment in the EU has increased by 750 percent compared to the previous year. Investments were primarily made in high-tech industry, the manufacturing of electronic components and in the sectors of energy, of finance and insurance, of wholesale and retail and of information and communications.

Over the last years, Taiwan has repeatedly emphasized the need for a formalization of its economic cooperation with the EU through a Bilateral Investment Agreement (BIA) and the European Parliament has passed over 10 resolutions in favor of a BIA, however, according to the European Commission, such a formal bilateral trade and investment agreement is not necessary as the Commission considers the already existing commercial conditions as being sufficient to guarantee stable relations. It seems that the European Union has adopted a cautious approach in respect of its official position in order to avoid possible negative repercussions on its economic relations with China such as potential trade sanctions.

== Security cooperation ==
In 2011 and 2012 Taiwan worked with the EU's Naval Force in Operation Atalanta to counter piracy off the coast of Somalia. Since then exchanges and information sharing has continued, between 2011 and 2015 EU anti-piracy officials made five visits to Taiwan.

Cybersecurity is a field of strategic cooperation between the EU and Taiwan with both facing a significant cyber threat from the People's Republic of China.

== Taiwan's foreign relations with EU member states ==
- Austria
- Belgium
- Bulgaria
- Croatia
- Cyprus
- Czech Republic
- Denmark
- Estonia
- Finland
- France
- Germany
- Greece
- Hungary
- (Republic of Ireland) Ireland
- Italy
- Latvia
- Lithuania
- Luxembourg
- Malta
- Netherlands
- Poland
- Portugal
- Romania
- Slovakia
- Slovenia
- Spain
- Sweden

== See also ==
- Foreign relations of Taiwan
- Foreign relations of the European Union
- Free trade agreements of Taiwan
- China–European Union relations
