= Caroline Vreeland =

German-American singer (born 1987)

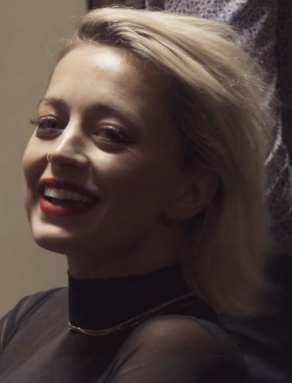
- Cropped still of Vreeland from Gladimir Gelin's 2017 short film Spaghetti, Wine and Caroline Vreeland

Background information
- Born: Caroline Olivia Zickerick; October 26, 1987 (age 39); Washington, D.C., U.S.
- Genres: Pop; blues
- Occupations: Singer, songwriter, model, actress, producer
- Years active: 2014–present
- Label: Caroline Vreeland
- Father: Michael Zickerick

Caroline Olivia Zickerick (born October 26, 1987), known professionally as Caroline Vreeland, is a German-American singer-songwriter, actress, and model. She is known for her role as Mary Davis on the American music drama television series Star. Vreeland released her first full album, Notes on Sex and Wine, in 2020.

== Early life and family ==
Caroline Vreeland was born Caroline Olivia Zickerick in Washington, D.C. to Daisy Vreeland and Michael Zickerick. Her father, a German diplomat, served as the German Ambassador to Moldova and as the Director General of the German Institute Taipei in Taiwan. Her maternal great-grandmother was fashion editor Diana Vreeland. She is a grandniece of American diplomat Frederick Vreeland and a first cousin once removed of the Buddhist abbot Nicholas Vreeland. Vreeland spent four months of her childhood living at the German Embassy in Kingston, Jamaica while her father was stationed there. Her father later had an affair and her parents divorced. Vreeland's mother moved them to a Siddha Yoga ashram in Upstate New York. They left New York and moved in with her grandparents in Belvedere, Marin County in the San Francisco Bay Area. After graduating from high school she moved to Los Angeles to pursue a music career.

== Career ==
Vreeland worked as a waitress and bartender in Los Angeles while pursuing a career in music. When she was twenty-one she filmed a reality television show pilot episode produced by Ryan Seacrest. The show didn't make it past production. In 2013, she was a contestant on the twelfth season of American Idol but was dismissed from the competition once it was revealed that she had previously worked with Seacrest.

In 2014, Vreeland was signed with boutique music label BlessandSee and began making music full-time. She began working on her EP in 2015. She released a single, Unbreakable Love. Her six-song EP titled Like a Woman Like a Drunkard Like an Animal, which she produced on her own, was released in 2018. She has cited Fiona Apple and Portishead as musical influences. She began working on a second musical project, titled Please Feel, in 2018.

In February 2019 Vreeland performed at the 21st amfAR New York City Gala, which opens New York Fashion Week and raises money for AIDS research.

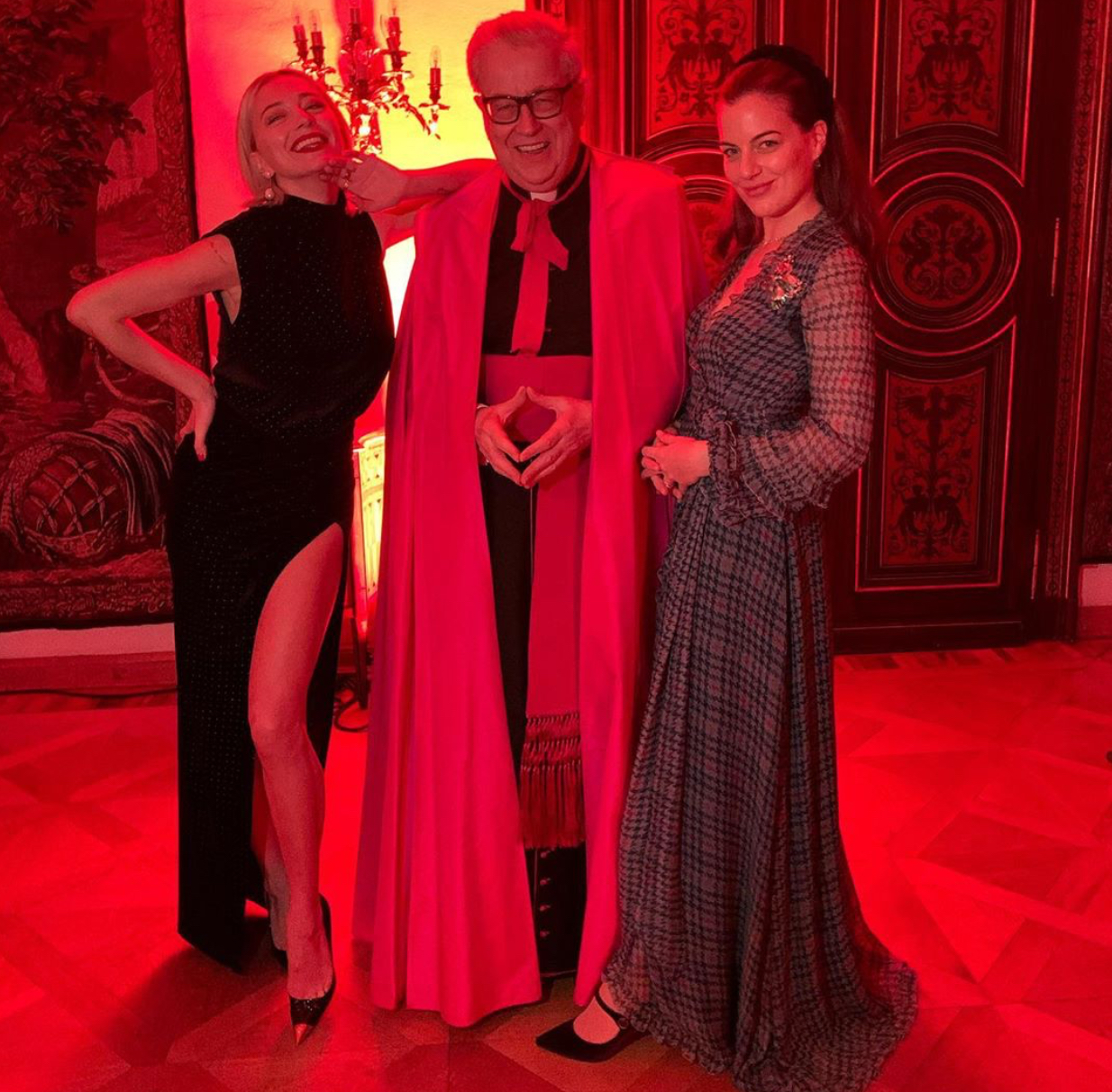
Vreeland with Wilhelm Imkamp and Cleopatra, Hereditary Princess of Oettingen-Spielberg after a performance in December 2019

Vreeland is signed with Next Models and had her first modeling job in an editorial spread for Vogue Italia. After her work with Vogue Italia she was discovered by Carine Roitfeld, the former editor-in-chief of Vogue Paris, who invited her to model in an editorial in CR Fashion Book. In 2018 Vreeland began working at CR Fashion Book as a writer with her own column, Going to Bed with Caroline Vreeland. In June 2016, she was featured on the cover of Harper's Bazaar Russia. In 2019 she walked the runway for Marco De Vincenzo's Autumn/Winter 2019/20 collection at Milan Fashion Week.

Vreeland made her acting debut in the 2007 thriller film Children of Moloch. In 2016 she starred in the French short film Diary. In 2018, she landed a recurring role on the television series Star.

In October 2019, Vreeland performed at the Casino de Monte Carlo for members of the Monegasque princely family.

Vreeland released her first full album, titled Notes on Sex and Wine, on 28 February 2020.

== Personal life ==
Vreeland is a dual citizen of the United States and Germany. She lives in Montreal, Canada. She has a large social media following, and is known as an influencer on Instagram.

Vreeland identifies as sexually fluid. In 2016, she was in a relationship with Tasya van Ree and, later, dated Cuban restaurateur Jason Odio.

In 2019, Vreeland met Nicolas Rico, a Canadian arts festival organizer, at Art Basel. They married in a small, private ceremony on December 7, 2020 in the penthouse of the Ludlow Hotel on the Lower East Side of Manhattan. Due to the COVID-19 pandemic in the United States, there were only ten guests in attendance at the wedding. They welcomed their first child, a son, in February 2022. Their second son was born in November 2023.

== Discography ==
=== Albums ===
Title	Details
Notes on Sex and Wine	Released: 2020; Format: Digital download

=== Extended plays ===
Title	Details
Like a Woman Like a Drunkard Like an Animal	Released: 2018; Format: Digital download

=== Singles ===
Year	Title	Album
2018	Unbreakable Love	Non-album single
2019	Stay Drunk With Me	Non-album single

==== As featured artist ====
Year	Title	Album
2018	Blue Lips (Galactic Marvl featuring Caroline Vreeland)	Non-album single

== Filmography ==
=== Television ===
Year	Title	Role	Director	Notes
2017	Star	Mary Davis	Lee Daniels	Recurring role

=== Film ===
Year	Title	Role	Director	Notes
2007	Children of Moloch	Rachael	Frank Peluso	
2016	Diary	Marilyn Monroe	Rosalie Miller	Short film
