= Joseph S. B. Mitchell =

American computer scientist and mathematician

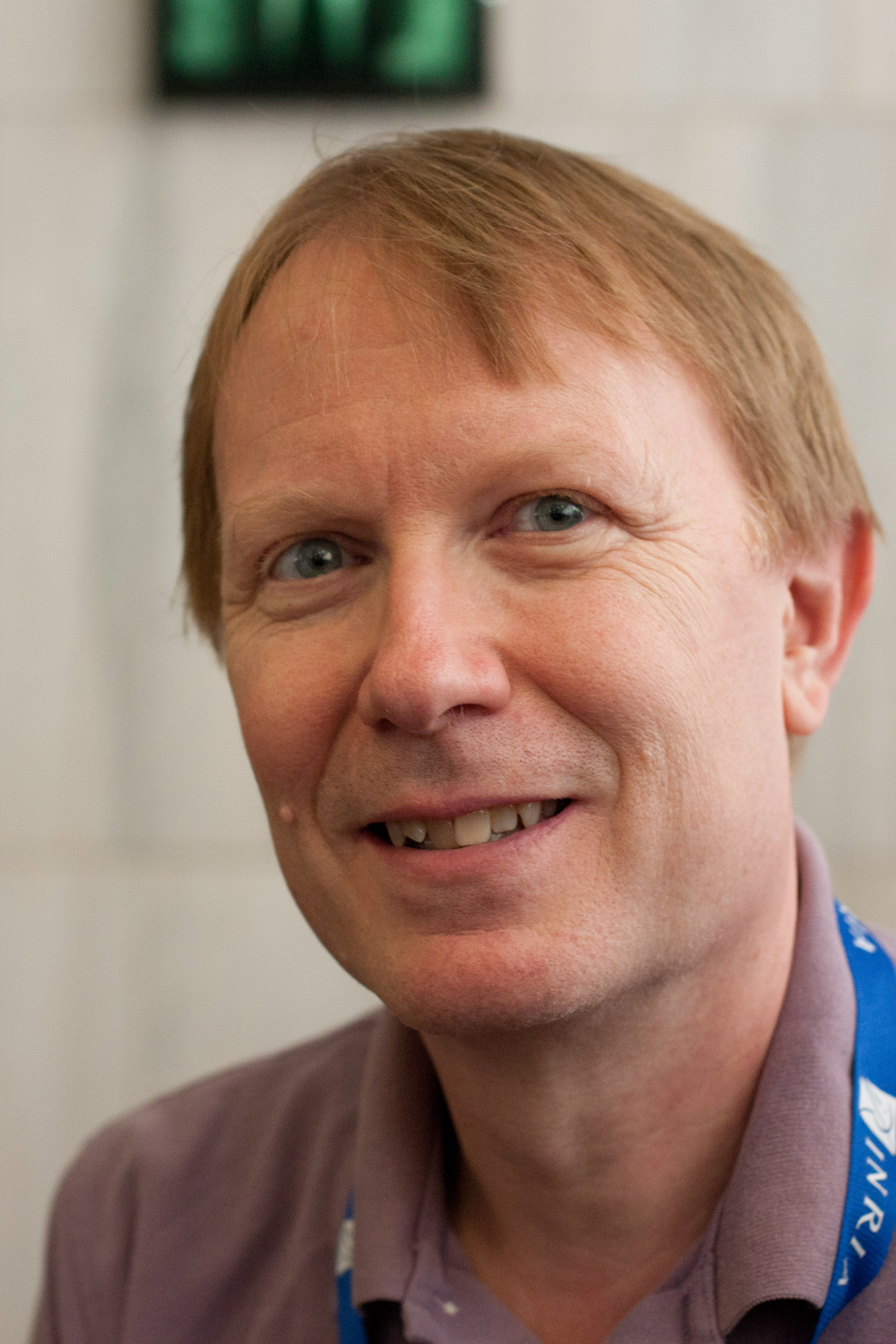
- Joe Mitchell at SoCG 2011
- Education: Carnegie Mellon University; Stanford University
- Known for: Computational geometry
- Awards: Gödel Prize (2010)
- Scientific career
- Fields: Theoretical Computer Science; Computational Geometry; Applied Mathematics; Operations Research
- Workplaces: Stony Brook University; Cornell University
- Doctoral advisor: Christos Papadimitriou

Joseph S. B. Mitchell is an American computer scientist and mathematician. He is distinguished professor and department chair of applied mathematics and statistics and research professor of computer science at Stony Brook University.

== Biography ==
Mitchell received a BS (1981, physics and applied mathematics), and an MS (1981, mathematics) from Carnegie Mellon University, and Ph.D. (1986, operations research) from Stanford University (under advisership of Christos Papadimitriou). He was with Hughes Research Laboratories (1981–86) and then on the faculty of Cornell University (1986–1991). He now serves as distinguished professor of applied mathematics and statistics and research professor of computer science at Stony Brook University. He serves as chair of the Department of Applied Mathematics and Statistics (since 2014).

Mitchell has served for several years on the Computational Geometry Steering Committee, often as Chair. He is on the editorial board of the journals Discrete and Computational Geometry, Computational Geometry: Theory and Applications, Journal of Computational Geometry, and the Journal of Graph Algorithms and Applications, and is an editor-in-chief of the International Journal of Computational Geometry and Applications. He has served on numerous program committees and was co-chair of the PC for the 21st ACM Symposium on Computational Geometry (2005).

== Research ==
Mitchell's primary research area is computational geometry, applied to problems in computer graphics, visualization, air traffic management, manufacturing, and geographic information systems.

== Awards and honors ==
Mitchell has been an NSF Presidential Young Investigator, Fulbright Scholar, and a recipient of the President's Award for Excellence in Scholarship and Creative Activities. He shared the 2010 Gödel Prize with Sanjeev Arora for devising a polynomial-time approximation scheme for the Euclidean travelling salesman problem. In 2011 the Association for Computing Machinery listed him as an ACM Fellow for his research in computational geometry and approximation algorithms. He has also won numerous teaching awards.
