= You Ching =

Taiwanese legal scholar (born 1942)

You Ching MLY
- 尤清
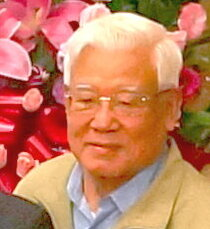
- You in 2021

Taiwanese Representative to Germany
- In office 9 September 2007 – 20 May 2008
- Preceded by: Shieh Jhy-wey
- Succeeded by: Wei Wu-lien

Member of the Legislative Yuan
- In office 1 February 2002 – September 2007
- In office 1 February 1987 – 20 December 1989
- Constituency: Taipei

7th Magistrate of Taipei County
- In office 20 December 1989 – 20 December 1997
- Preceded by: Lin Fong-cheng
- Succeeded by: Su Tseng-chang

Personal details
- Born: 20 March 1942 (age 84) Takao Prefecture, Taiwan, Empire of Japan
- Party: Democratic Progressive Party
- Education: National Chengchi University (LLB); Chinese Culture University (LLM); Heidelberg University (PhD)

You Ching (Chinese: 尤清; pinyin: Yóu Qīng; Wade–Giles: You^{2} Ching^{1}; born 20 March 1942) is a Taiwanese legal scholar and diplomat who served as the Taiwanese representative to Germany from 2007 to 2008.

== Early life and education ==
You was born in Kaohsiung on March 20, 1942. He graduated from National Chengchi University with a Bachelor of Laws (LL.B.) in 1965 and earned a Master of Laws (LL.M.) form Chinese Culture University. He then completed doctoral studies in law in Germany, earning his Ph.D. in law from Heidelberg University in 1978 under German jurist Adolf Laufs.

== Entry into politics ==
He became a practicing attorney in 1978. A Tangwai activist and Kaohsiung Incident lawyer, You Ching founded the Taiwan Panorama magazine (博觀; not to be confused with present-day Taiwan Panorama 台灣光華) in 1982. The magazine called for the establishment of an opposition party, at a time when the Kuomintang-imposed martial law disallowed any opposition parties. He was instrumental in drafting the founding documents of the Democratic Progressive Party (DPP).

== Political career ==
You was elected as the first non-Kuomintang member of the Control Yuan in 1980. After the establishment of the DPP in 1986, he first served as a member of the Legislative Yuan from 1987 to 1989, and then served two terms as the magistrate of Taipei County from 1989 to 1997. He was again elected to the legislature in 2001 and reelected in 2004.

In 2006, You went on a three-day trip with a legislator group to the United States to discuss a bilateral free trade agreement between the two countries with Oregon Senator Ron Wyden and other U.S. officials.

You became the Taiwanese representative to Germany in 2007 and served until 2008.

== Personal life ==
You Ching's younger brother You Hung was a member of the Legislative Yuan between 1993 and 1999.
