= Der-Tsai Lee =

Taiwanese computer scientist

- 李德財
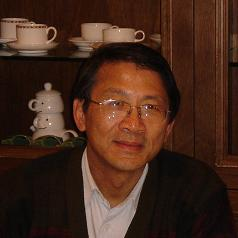
- Lee in 2009
- Born: 1949 (age 76–77); Taiwan
- Education: National Taiwan University (BS); University of Illinois at Urbana-Champaign (MS, PhD)
- Known for: Computational Geometry
- Awards: IEEE Fellow (1992); ACM Fellow (1997); Academician of Academia Sinica, Taiwan (2004)
- Scientific career
- Fields: Computer science
- Workplaces: Academia Sinica
- Thesis: Proximity and reachability in the plane (1978)
- Doctoral advisor: Franco P. Preparata

Der-Tsai Lee (Chinese: 李德財), also known as D. T. Lee, is a Taiwanese computer scientist known for his work in computational geometry. For many years he was a professor at Northwestern University. He has been a distinguished research fellow of the Institute for Information Science at Academia Sinica in Taipei, Taiwan, since 1998. From 1998 to 2008, he was director of this institute.

Lee was the president of National Chung Hsing University from August 1, 2011 to July 31, 2015. He was also an advisory committee member of the National Security Council from 2016 to 2020. Currently, he has been the chairman of Higher Education Evaluation and Accreditation Council of Taiwan since 2020.

== Education ==
Lee graduated from National Taiwan University with a Bachelor of Science (B.S.) in electrical engineering in 1971. He then earned an M.S. in 1976 and his Ph.D. in 1978, both from the University of Illinois Urbana-Champaign under the supervision of Franco Preparata.

== Academic career ==
After holding a faculty position at Northwestern University for 20 years, he moved to the Academia Sinica in 1998. He also holds faculty positions at National Taiwan University, National Taiwan University of Science and Technology, and National Chiao Tung University. He is a Fellow of the IEEE and the ACM. He was elected as the Academician of Academia Sinica, Taiwan in 2004. He also won the Humboldt Research Award in 2007 and elected as the member of The Academy of Sciences for the Developing World (also known as Third World Academy of Sciences) (TWAS) in 2008. In 2010, he became the Humboldt Ambassador Scientist. He has published near 200 research papers, and an ISI highly cited researcher. He is editor in chief of the International Journal of Computational Geometry and Applications.

He was awarded the German-Taiwanese Friendship Medal by Michael Zickerick, the Director General of the German Institute Taipei, in May 2014. In 2022, he was elected as the Distinguished Alumni of National Taiwan University.
