= Germany–Taiwan relations =

- Germany: Taiwan

Diplomatic mission
- German Institute, Taipei: Taipei Representative Office, Berlin

Envoy
- Director General Karsten Tietz: Representative Gu Ruey-sheng

In 1861, Prussia and the Qing dynasty signed the first Sino-German treaty during the Eulenburg Expedition. After the partition of Germany following World War II, the Federal Republic of Germany (West Germany) maintained bilateral relations with the Republic of China (Taiwan) that did not involve diplomatic recognition.

Germany today considers the People's Republic of China (PRC) as "the sole representative of China." but also holds Taiwan to be a "partner of common values." It has deepened its economic and other informal relations with Taiwan while trying to preserve strong ties with the PRC.

Germany is Taiwan's largest export destination in Europe. Taiwan is one of Germany's key economic partners in Asia, and the flow of investment between the two has grown steadily over the years.

== History ==
=== Early years ===
Since Taiwan opened its ports for foreign trade in mid-19th century, by the Qing dynasty, the last imperial dynasty of China, German trade companies began establishing presence on the island. It was a time when Southern harbor cities such as Dagou (Kaohsiung) and Anping (Tainan) were preferred over their Northern counterparts, Tamsui and Keelung, for trading business.

Following the defeat of the Qing in the First Sino-Japanese War, Taiwan was ceded to the Japanese empire in 1895. The German Empire opened the consulate in the Tamsui River that same year before closing in 1908 by the Imperial Japanese government.

In 1896, the undersecretary of state of the Foreign Office, Hara Takashi, considered turning the new colony into an extension of the Japanese metropole, modeled on the examples of the relationship between Alsace-Lorraine and Germany as well as that between Algeria and France. By contrast Gotō Shinpei held the view that, racially, the Taiwanese were highly dissimilar from the Japanese in the metropole and that for this reason the island of Taiwan had to have a different administrative structure. In 1898, Gotō was appointed head of the civil administration of the colonial government of Taiwan and, as a result, the “laissez-faire” assimilation policy prevailed.

However, the colonial government interests in the German relations did not disappear immediately. One year later, Sakatani Yoshirō, a member of Taiwan Association, proposed to establish a Japanese university in Taiwan, referring to the University of Strasbourg, although it was not met with approval in government circles. Moreover, the first recorded Japanese delegation to Alsace-Lorraine was represented by a civil servant of the Taiwanese colonial government who visited schools and state institutions, such as courts of justice, prisons, and city administration in 1900. Thirty years later, this official, Ishizuka Eizō, became the governor of Taiwan. However, after this visit, no other delegation related to the colonial government in Taiwan was sent to Alsace-Lorraine.

=== Post-World War II ===
After the war, Taiwan was reverted to the Republic of China, the regime that had overthrown the Qing 34 years prior, and Germany was placed under Allied occupation. However, with the onset of the Cold War, the Federal Republic of Germany or West Germany initially did not recognize the People's Republic of China primarily because based on the "One Germany" principle, the Adenauer government avoided recognizing the ROC or the PRC, thereby preventing third world countries from recognizing East Germany. Therefore, West Germany's relations with Taiwan were limited to economic, trade, and cultural exchanges, and it was unwilling to engage in political dialogue.

West Germany formally supported the One-China policy, in hopes of finding Chinese backing of the reunification of Germany. In 1972, West Germany officially established diplomatic contacts with the PRC, although unofficial contacts had been in existence since 1964. In the 1960s West Germany participated in the Mingteh Project (Ming-teh-Gruppe in German) in which off-duty officers were sent to Taiwan to advise the government of Chiang Kai-shek.

Germany has treated the People's Republic of China (PRC) as the sole representative of China, " but also considers Taiwan a "partner of common values." Its relations with Taiwan no longer operate at a level that would imply official diplomatic recognition.

=== Recent history ===
In 2020, a diplomatic spat arose between the two countries when the German Foreign Ministry removed the Taiwanese flag from a page describing bilateral relations.

In 2020, Daniela Kluckert voiced her support for stronger relations with Taiwan.

In January 2021, the German government appealed to the Taiwanese government to help persuade Taiwanese semiconductor companies to ramp up production as a global semiconductor shortage was hampering the German economy's recovery from the COVID-19 pandemic. A lack of semiconductors had caused vehicle production lines to be idled leading German Economy Minister Peter Altmaier to personally reach out to Taiwan's economics affairs minister Wang Mei-hua in an attempt to get Taiwanese semiconductor companies to increase their manufacturing capacity. In response Wang Mei-hua sought Germany's help in securing vaccines against COVID-19.

In July 2021, Germany and Taiwan signed an agreement expanding air traffic between the two countries. Weekly passenger flights were increased from 7 to 12 and cargo flights were increased from three to five with fifth freedom rights.

In July 2021, German Representative in Taiwan Thomas Prinz was awarded Taiwan's Grand Medal of Diplomacy.

In October 2021, a Tweet from the Global Times which called for a “final solution to the Taiwan question” was condemned by Frank Müller-Rosentritt of the Free Democratic Party for its similarity to the “final solution to the Jewish question” which resulted in the Holocaust.

In December 2021, the Bundestag passed a resolution calling on the government to expand ties and cooperation with Taiwan.

In October 2022, a Bundestag delegation led by Klaus-Peter Willsch visited Taiwan.

In March 2023, Germany and Taiwan signed an agreement which expanded cooperation on legal and criminal matters. In July 2023 German Justice Minister Marco Buschmann and Taiwanese Minister of Justice Tsai Ching-hsiang met in Germany, the first time that justice ministers from the two countries had met face to face in an official capacity.

Since 2023, Germany has expanded its informal relations with Taiwan while trying to maintain strong ties with the PRC.

In April 2026, the German government denied requests for Taiwan to let President Lai Ching-te to fly through German airspace en route to a potential visit to Eswatini.

== Economic relations ==
=== Trade ===
In 2022, bilateral trade between Germany and Taiwan reached approximately US$24.4 billion, with Germany exporting around US$12 billion worth of goods to Taiwan and importing about US$12.4 billion from Taiwan.

Germany's primary exports to Taiwan include integrated circuits ($2.04B), cars ($1.66B), and aircraft, including planes and helicopters ($1.08B). Conversely, Taiwan mainly exports integrated circuits ($2.97B), vehicle parts ($1.27B), and office machine parts ($673M).

The 2022 trade volume, slightly higher than the previous year, remained significantly above pre-pandemic levels, signaling a continuation of stable growth in trade between the two countries. Since 2017, Germany's exports to Taiwan grew at an annual rate of 6.69%, rising from $8.66B in 2017 to $12B in 2022. Meanwhile, Taiwan's exports to Germany increased by 5.38% annually, reaching $12.4B in 2022 from $8.15B in 2017.

=== Investment ===
The economic ties between Germany and Taiwan are further strengthened by mutual investments. German multinational corporations, including Siemens and Volkswagen, have established significant operations in Taiwan, contributing to the island's industrial and technological development.

A major milestone in Germany–Taiwan relations came when, in August 2023, Taiwan Semiconductor Manufacturing Company (TSMC), the world's leading semiconductor manufacturer, announced a significant investment in Germany. In 2024, TSMC began the construction of a cutting-edge semiconductor manufacturing plant in Dresden. This investment, valued at over €10 billion, aims to secure Taiwan's role as a global leader in semiconductor production while providing the EU with greater access to critical chip technology. The plant is expected to supply not only Germany but the broader European market, supporting industries such as automotive, electronics, and telecommunications, with a special focus on Germany's flagship automotive industry.

A new student exchange program was also established by the state of Saxony, Dresden University of Technology and TSMC in order to develop human capital for developing semiconductor manufacturing.

== Representative offices ==
=== German Institute Taipei ===
Based in Taipei, located in the famous skyscraper Taipei 101.

The German Institute holds an annual Oktoberfest celebration.

=== Taipei Representative Office in the Federal Republic of Germany ===
Based in Berlin, it also has offices in Frankfurt, Hamburg and Munich.

== See also ==
- Foreign relations of Taiwan
- Foreign relations of Germany
- Taiwan–European Union relations
