= Embassy of Germany, Abuja =

Diplomatic mission of Germany to Nigeria

Coordinates: 9.0979°N 7.482°E

The German Embassy in Abuja is Germany's diplomatic mission to Nigeria.

The embassy is located at 9 Lake Maracaibo Close, off Amazon Street Maitama / Abuja F.C.T. The consulate-general is located in Lagos at 15, Walter Carrington Crescent, Victoria Island - Lagos, Nigeria.

The embassy is also home to a consulate various departments and a military attaché.

Current German Ambassador to Nigeria is Birgitt Ory.
