= Michael Zickerick =

German diplomat

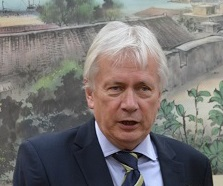
- Zickerick in 2014.

Director General of the German Institute Taipei
- In office 2011–2014
- President: Christian Wulff (2010-2012); Joachim Gauck (2012-2014)
- Preceded by: Birgitt Ory
- Succeeded by: Martin Eberts

German Ambassador to Moldova
- In office 2000–2004
- President: Johannes Rau

Personal details
- Born: November 21, 1948 (age 77) Braunschweig, Lower Saxony, Germany
- Spouse: Daisy Vreeland (divorced)
- Children: 3 (including Caroline Vreeland)
- Education: LMU Munich
- Profession: diplomat
- Awards: Order of Brilliant Star

Michael Zickerick (born 21 November 1948) is a German diplomat. He served as the German ambassador to Moldova from 2000 to 2004 and as the director general of the German Institute Taipei in Taiwan from 2011 to 2014. Zickerick is a recipient of the Order of Brilliant Star.

== Early life and education ==
Zickerick was born on 21 November 1948 in Braunschweig, Lower Saxony. He grew up in Bavaria. Zickerick studied social sciences, political science, and communication studies at LMU Munich and spent semesters abroad in the United States at the University of Wisconsin–Madison and in Switzerland at the University of Geneva. He obtained a master's degree from LMU Munich in 1979. He obtained a doctorate in philosophy from the university in 1980. Zickerick was a research associate at the Friedrich Ebert Stiftung in Lagos, Nigeria.

== Career ==
Zickerick began his diplomatic career in 1980, working for the German Foreign Office as an attaché. Throughout the 1980s he represented Germany in various African nations. He was a cultural officer at the German embassy in Tunis, Tunisia from 1982 to 1985. For the next two years he was a diplomatic representative at the German embassy in Kampala, Uganda. From 1987 to 1990, Zickerick worked as a consultant for culture and public relations at the Embassy of Germany, Washington, D.C. From 1990 to 1992 he worked again for the Foreign Office in Bonn and then worked as a representative at the German embassy in Kingston, Jamaica. He left Jamaica to work at the German consulate general in San Francisco until 1997. In the late 1990s he worked in Germany, focusing on the federal government's programs for relationships with Eastern Europe and implementing the Stability and Growth Pact.

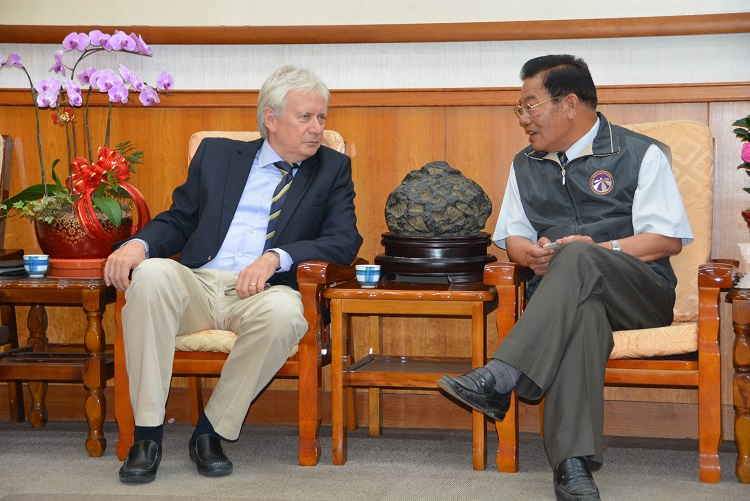
Zickerick in Penghu, Taiwan in 2014.

In 2000 Zickerick was appointed as the German ambassador to Moldova, taking up residence at the Embassy of Germany, Chișinău. He served in that capacity until 2004. From 2004 to 2007 he served as an envoy to the German embassy in Tehran, Iran. Zickerick later served as the consul general at the German consulate general in Djidda, Saudi Arabia, until 2011.

From 2011 to 2014 he served as the director general of the German Institute Taipei in Taiwan. While serving as director general, Zickerick oversaw an agreement to deter tax evasion and abolish double income taxation and capital gains. He also facilitated an agreement regarding transferring prisoners. He was awarded the Order of Brilliant Star for his service in Taiwan. At his farewell celebration, he presented the German-Taiwanese Friendship Medal to Charlotte Han, the honorary president of the Sino-German Cultural and Economic Association, to Angelika Chen, a businesswoman from Southern Taiwan, and to Der-Tsai Lee, president of National Chung Hsing University. Zickerick was succeeded by Martin Eberts.

As of 2020 Zickerick serves as the chairman of the German-Chinese Association-Friends of Taiwan.

== Personal life ==
Zickerick was married to Daisy Vreeland, a granddaughter of French-American fashion editor Diana Vreeland. They have two daughters, Caroline and Alexandra. He and Vreeland later divorced. Zickerick remarried and has a son, Max, with his second wife.
