= Martin Eberts =

German diplomat

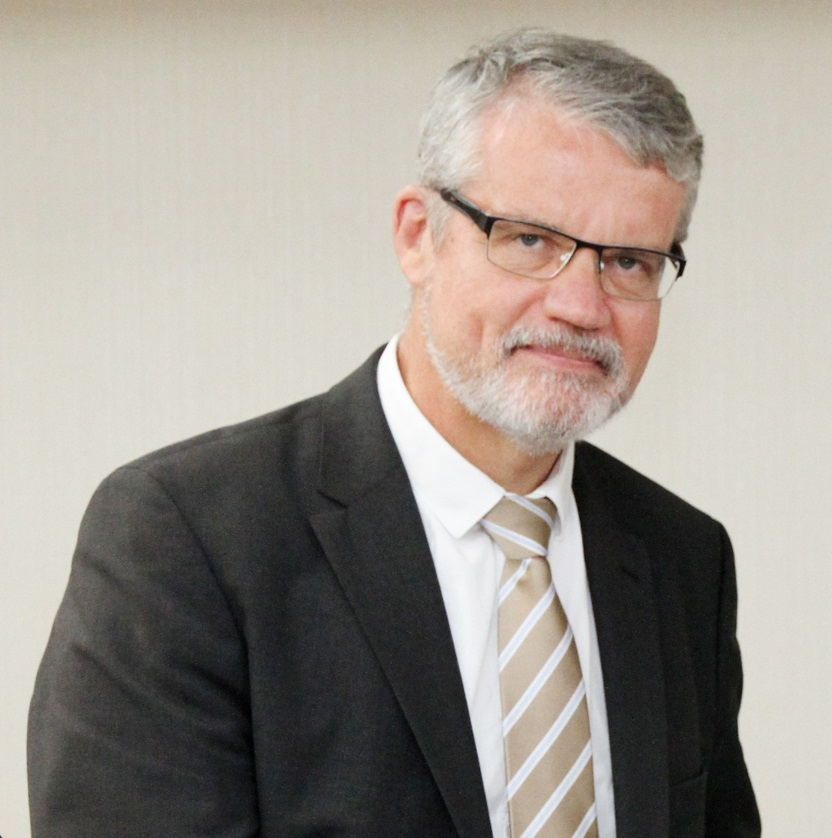
- Eberts in 2015

German Consul General in Osaka
- Incumbent
- Assumed office July 2020 - present
- President: Frank-Walter Steinmeier
- Preceded by: Werner Köhler

Minister of the German Embassy in Jakarta
- In office July 2018 – July 2020
- President: Frank-Walter Steinmeier

Director General of the German Institute Taipei
- In office August 2014 – July 2018
- President: Joachim Gauck (2014-2017) Frank-Walter Steinmeier (2017-2018)
- Preceded by: Michael Zickerick
- Succeeded by: Thomas Prinz

Personal details
- Born: 1957 (age 68–69)
- Children: 4
- Education: University of Bonn
- Profession: diplomat

Martin Eberts (born 1957) is a German diplomat. From 2014 to 2018 he served as the Director General of the German Institute Taipei. In 2020 he was appointed as the Consul General at the German Consulate in Osaka, Japan.

== Career ==
Eberts began his preparatory service for the Federal Foreign Office in 1986 and completed the training program in 1991. He was appointed as an advisor for press and public relations at the German Embassy in Hungary and, from 1991 to 1993, worked as an advisor for Central Europe at the Foreign Office in Bonn. From 1993 to 1997 he was a political and public relations officer at the German Embassy in Saudi Arabia. The following year Eberts was part of an exchange program with the Ministry of Europe and Foreign Affairs in France, advising on Eastern European affairs. He was made deputy head of the Economic and Trade Department at the German Embassy in France in 1998, serving in this capacity until 2001.

Ebert returned to Germany in 2001 to work as a lecturer in the Legation Council at the Foreign Office in Berlin. From 2005 to 2009 he was the deputy head of the political department at the German Embassy in Japan. For the next three years Eberts served as the Head of the Department for German Cultural Institutions Abroad. From 2012 to 2014 he served as the Head of the Department for Economics and Global Issues at the German Embassy in Brazil.

In August 2014 Eberts succeeded Michael Zickerick as the Director General of the German Institute Taipei, serving as the diplomatic representative of Germany to Taiwan until July 2018. While serving as Director General, Eberts spoke in favor of Holocaust education in Taiwan, stating that learning about the sufferings during that period, as well as the stories of victims and survivors, would help prevent future tragedies. He also spoke out against Chinese coercion against Taiwan, such as China's insistence that international airlines refer to Taiwan as part of China, calling China's demands "childish". He voiced support for Taiwan's inclusion in global issues involving public health, aviation, and antiterrorism.

On 20 July 2018 he named Taiwanese professor Tseng Tzu-feng as an honorary director of the Institute for Southern Taiwan. Eberts was succeeded by Thomas Prinz on 30 July 2018. Later that year he was appointed as Head of the Political Department at the German Embassy in Indonesia.

In July 2020, Eberts was appointed as the Consul General at the German Consulate General in Osaka.

== Personal life ==
Eberts studied history, German literature, and theology at the University of Bonn.

He is Catholic and married with four children.

== Controversy ==
In October 2021, the German news magazine Der Spiegel reported that, while serving as Consul General in Osaka, Eberts used the German Film Festival organized by the consulate to arrange the screening of the U.S. film Unplanned (2019), which has been widely described as an anti-abortion propaganda film. According to the magazine, the festival flyer promoted the screening “on the personal recommendation of the Consul General.” According to the report, Eberts repeatedly advocated for Catholic Church interests in emails to the German community. On his public Facebook page, he also actively supported right-wing Catholic pro-life organizations. The German Foreign Office stated that the festival was the sole responsibility of the consulate and that the social media posts were Eberts’s personal opinions.
