= Embassy of Germany, Dhaka =

Embassy of Germany in Bangladesh
- Location: Baridhara, Dhaka
- Address: 11 Felani Ave, Dhaka 1212
- Ambassador: H.E. Rüdiger Lotz
- Website: www.dhaka.diplo.de

The Embassy of Germany in Dhaka is the diplomatic mission of Germany in Bangladesh.

The embassy is located at Felani Avenue, in Dhaka.

== Ambassadors ==
Ambassador	in office	remarks
Willi Albert Ritter	1974–1976	
Wolf-Dietrich Schilling	1976–1979	
Walther Marschall von Bieberstein	1979–1985	
Klaus Max Franke	1985–1991	
Karl-Heinz Scholtyssek	1991–1992	
Jürgen Gehl	1993–1995	
Uwe Schramm	1998–2001	
Dietrich Andreas	2001–2006	
Frank Meyke	2006–2009	
Holger Michael	2009–2012	
Albrecht Conze	2012–2014	
Thomas Prinz	2015–2018	
Peter Fahrenholtz	2018–2021	
Achim Tröster	Since 2021	
