= Filip Grzegorzewski =

Polish diplomat

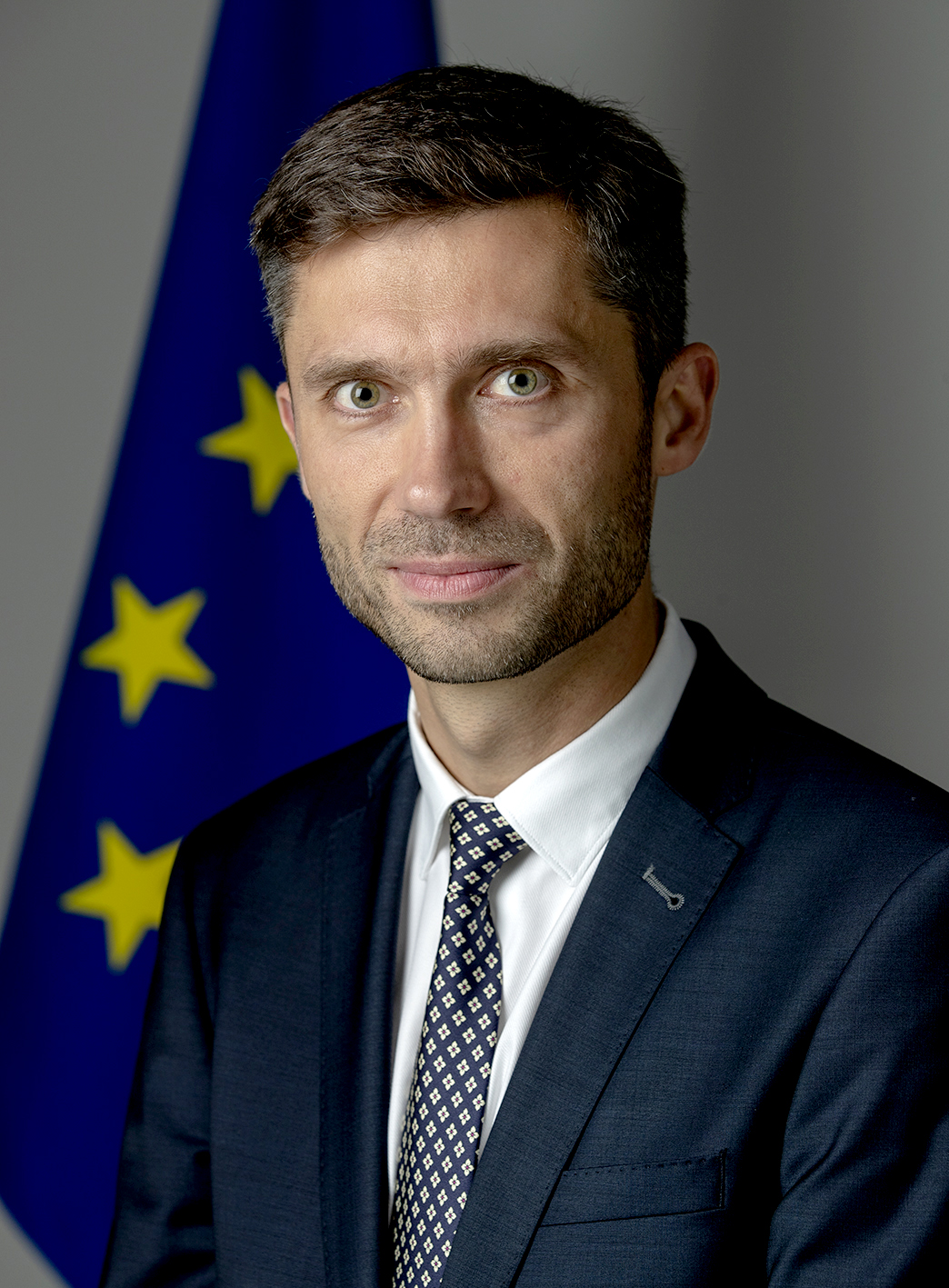
- Official portrait, 2019

Head of the European Economic and Trade Office in Taiwan
- In office 1 September 2019 – August 2024
- Preceded by: Madeleine Majorenko
- Succeeded by: Lutz Güllner

Personal details
- Education: University of Warsaw

Filip Tadeusz Grzegorzewski, PhD, a Polish and European diplomat, head of Information Integrity and Countering Foreign Information Manipulation and Interference (FIMI) Division of the European External Action Service (EEAS). From 2019 to 2024 he served as Head of the European Economic and Trade Office in Taiwan. He specialises in Asia, and held key positions in both his national diplomatic service and that of the European Union.

== Career ==
Filip Grzegorzewski defended (with distinction) his doctoral dissertation entitled “Taiwan’s Role in U.S.–China Great-Power Competition After 2010” at the University of Warsaw in 2025. He graduated from the Polish Diplomatic Academy and the University of Warsaw with a specialisation in Chinese studies and international relations. He also studied at Nanjing Normal University in China and at Hanoi University in Vietnam.

Grzegorzewski was Political Counsellor at the European Union Delegation to China and Mongolia between 2008 and 2011. This came after he served as COASI Representative at the Permanent Representation of Poland to the European Union (2005–2008).

From 2013 to mid-2015 he was Director General of Asia-Pacific Department at the Ministry of Foreign Affairs of the Republic of Poland. He also acted as ASEM Senior Official, and National Coordinator of the Central and Eastern Europe - China cooperation (16+1). Between 2011 and 2013 he was Head of the Policy Unit and Deputy Chief of Staff in the Ministry of Foreign Affairs.

From 2015 until 2019, Grzegorzewski was Chair of the Working Group on Asia-Oceania (COASI) of the Council of the European Union. The group brings together delegates from each EU member state Ministry of Foreign Affairs and meets weekly to prepare the decisions of the Council of the European Union on all matters pertaining to the two continents.

He was appointed the Head of the European Economic and Trade Office in Taiwan on 1 September 2019. He ended his mission in August 2024. Next, he became head of Information Integrity (and Countering Foreign Information Manipulation and Interference) at the European External Action Service.

Besides Polish, he speaks English, French, and Chinese.

== Honors ==
- Order of Brilliant Star with Grand Cordon (2024)

== Publications ==
- "European Union initiatives Supporting Asia-Pacific Countries in Combating the COVID-19 pandemic", in: Kołodziejczyk K., The EU Towards the Global South During the COVID-19 Pandemic, Peter Lang, 2023.
- "Strategic Ambiguity in US-Taiwan Relations During the Donald Trump Administration", in: Polish Political Science Yearbook, Volume 51 (2022).
