= You Hung =

Taiwanese politician

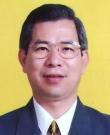
You Hung

You Hung (Chinese: 尤宏; born 21 July 1950) is a Taiwanese politician.

You was born in 1950. His elder brother is You Ching. You Hung studied law at Chinese Culture University and published Taiwan Panorama.

You's 1989 campaign for a Legislative Yuan seat was unsuccessful. He was elected to the legislature in 1992 and 1995, representing Kaohsiung County as a member of the Democratic Progressive Party. You was a candidate during the 1998 and 2001 legislative elections, and did not garner enough votes to be seated in either election cycle. He later served on the Democratic Progressive Party's Central Executive Committee and led the Southern Taiwan Joint Services Center as executive director.
