= Birgitt Ory =

German diplomat

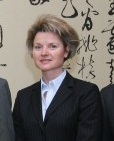
- Ory in 2009

German Ambassador to Ethiopia
- Incumbent
- Assumed office 2026
- President: Frank-Walter Steinmeier
- Preceded by: Jens Hanefeld

Director General of the German Institute Taipei
- In office 2008–2011
- President: Horst Köhler (2008-2010); Christian Wulff (2011)
- Preceded by: Detlef Boldt
- Succeeded by: Michael Zickerick

Personal details
- Born: 1964 (age 61–62) Lübeck, West Germany
- Children: 2
- Education: LMU Munich
- Profession: diplomat

Birgitt Ory (born 1964) is a German diplomat who has been Germany's Ambassador to Ethiopia and the African Union since early 2026.

From 2019 until 2022, Ory served as the German Ambassador to Nigeria. She was the first woman to serve as Director General of the German Institute Taipei in Taiwan, a post she held from 2008 to 2011.

== Early life and education ==
Ory was born in Lübeck in 1964. She graduated from high school in Neustadt in Holstein in 1983 and went on to study political science, communications, and German literature at LMU Munich, where she graduated summa cum laude.

== Career ==
Ory was assigned her first diplomatic post by the Federal Foreign Office in 1990, as an attachée at the Diplomatic Academy in Bonn, also working at the École nationale d'administration and the French Ministry of Foreign Affairs. The following year she was assigned a job in the German Foreign Office's Department of Economics and Humanitarian Aid.

In 1993, Ory was appointed as the Deputy Head of Mission at the German Embassy in Phnom Penh, Cambodia, serving there for two years. From 1998 to 2001, she was part of the Permanent Mission of Germany to the United Nations in New York City as part of the African Security Council. The next three years, she worked in the Office of the President of Germany's Foreign Policy Department. From 2004 to 2008, Ory was the Head of the Multilateral Cooperation Asia Division. From 2016 to 2018, she served as the Director of International Economic Affairs. Ory was the Chief of Staff for the Minister of State Affairs, Michelle Müntefering, from 2018 to 2019.

=== Director-General of the German Institute Taipei ===
In 2008, Ory was appointed as the Director-General of the German Institute Taipei in Taiwan, and was the first woman to hold this position. She was succeeded by Michael Zickerick as Director-General in 2011, and became the Director of the German Foreign Office's Southeast Asia and Pacific Department.

In June 2009, Ory unveiled the Buddy Bear for Taiwan at German Night in Taipei. The Buddy Bear, a 2-meter-high sculpture first created in Berlin in 2001, serves as the symbol of Germany's friendship, travelling internationally to promote peace and international understanding.

In February 2010, Ory helped unveil a memorial at 228 Peace Memorial Park honoring victims of the February 28 incident.

=== Ambassador to Nigeria ===
In September 2019, Ory was appointed as the Ambassador of Germany to Nigeria. She was received by President Muhammadu Buhari of Nigeria on September 19, 2019, to present her credentials. She was succeeded in 2022 by Annett Günther and went back to Berlin to take up a role in the German Foreign Office.

On 2 May 2020, Ory met with members of the Economic Community of West African States to discuss security measures. Later that month she congratulated Nigeria for holding two major offices in the United Nations, Deputy Secretary General and President of the United Nations General Assembly.

In August 2020, she called for a stronger partnership between the European Union and African nations, particularly Nigeria and the Economic Community of West African States. Ory stated that especially since the COVID-19 pandemic had shifted political priorities around the world, economic recovery is crucial. She disclosed that the Embassy of Germany, Abuja was working closely with Nigerian government agencies and local communities to help prevent the spread of COVID-19, including starting an initiative to provide free face masks and handwashing stations throughout the country. The initiative was officially launched on 3 August 2020 in the Federal Capital Territory. The resources provided were produced by women tailors from disadvantaged communities to help improve income opportunities as well as communal health. On 12 August 2020, Ory voiced support for the Nigerian government's fight against trafficking illicit wildlife products.

In September 2020, Ory helped plead on the behalf of the European Union for Nigeria to lift airspace restrictions against KLM, Air France, and Lufthansa. Also that month, she spoke at the opening of a rehabilitation center in Kaduna built by the German Technical Advisory Group as part of Germany's Equipment Aid Programme initiative.

=== Ambassador to Ethiopia ===
In 2025 Ory was nominated as ambassador of Germany to Ethiopia. In January 2026 she handed over her letter of credence to the president of the Federal Democratic Republic of Ethiopia, Taye Atske-Selassie.
