= Thomas Prinz =

German diplomat

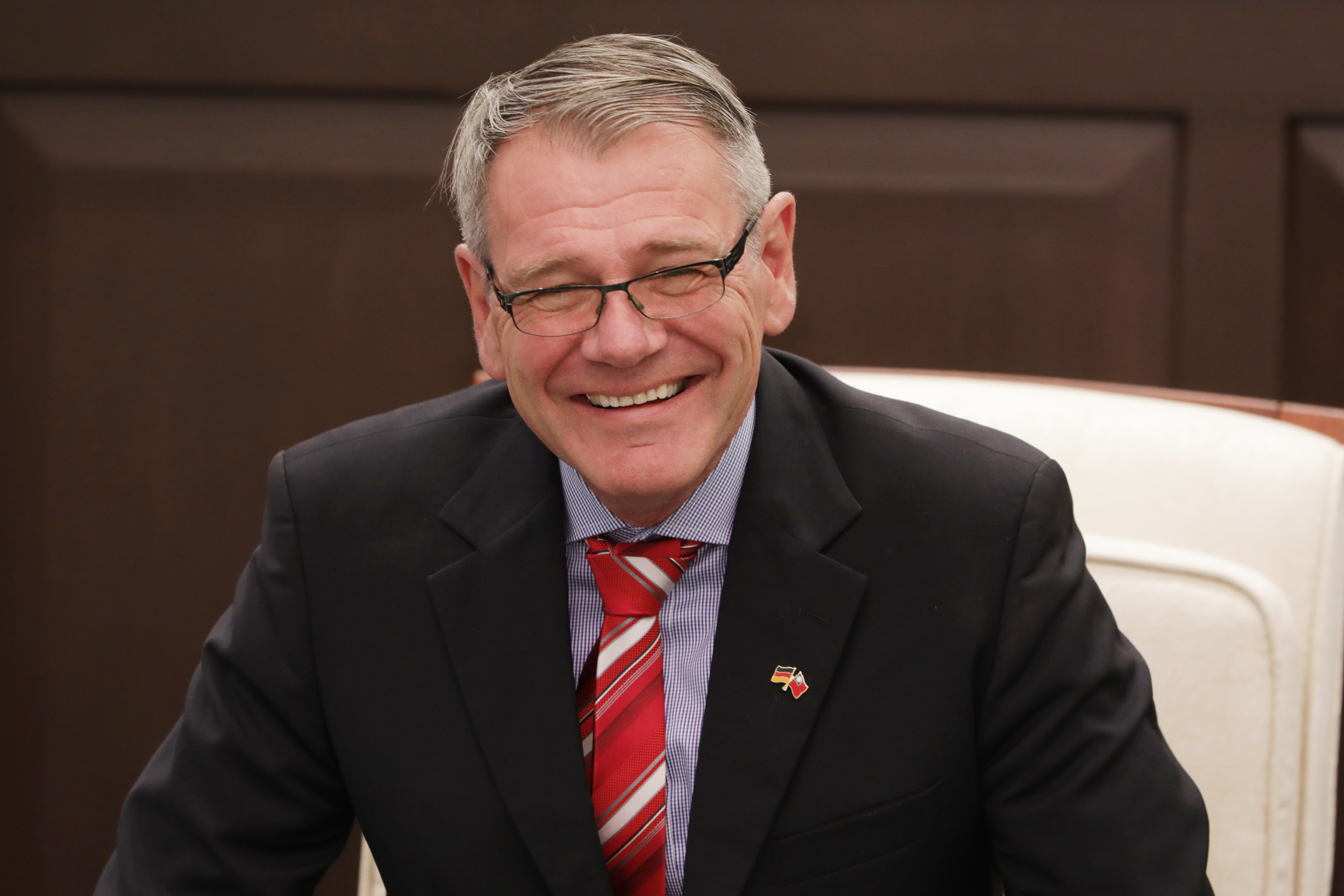

Director General of the German Institute Taipei
- In office July 30, 2018 – July 2021
- Preceded by: Martin Eberts
- Succeeded by: Jörg Polster

German Ambassador to Bangladesh
- In office April 10, 2015 – 2018

Personal details
- Born: June 7, 1959 (age 67) Wetzlar, Germany
- Children: 5
- Education: University of Heidelberg, University of Giessen
- Profession: Diplomat

Thomas Prinz (born June 7, 1959) is a German diplomat. He served as the Director General, German Institute Taipei from 2018 to 2021, and German Ambassador to Bangladesh from April 2015 to 2018.

== Education and early career ==
Thomas Prinz graduated from University of Heidelberg. He complete his PhD from South Asia Institute and also attended in University of Giessen.

== Foreign Service career ==
- 1998 – 2005: Participation in EU Election Observation missions
- 1990 – 1992: Federal Foreign Office, Bonn, Attaché
- 1992 – 1993: Federal Foreign Office, Bonn, 2nd Secretary, Cultural Department
- 1993 – 1997: German Embassy, Bucarest, 1st Secretary, Political
- 1997 – 2000: German Embassy Jakarta, 1st Secretary, Cultural Affairs
- 2000 – 2005: EU-Division, Federal Foreign Office, Berlin, Counselor
- 2005 – 2007: Dep. Director, Public Diplomacy of the German EU – Presidency – Division, Federal Foreign Office, Berlin
- 2007 – 2008: International Security Assistance Force (ISAF), Kabul, Political Advisor to COMISAF
- 2008 – 2010: German Embassy Tokyo, Political Counselor
- 2010 – 2010: German Consulate General Shanghai, Head of the Economic Department
- 2010 – 2011: German Embassy Canberra, Deputy Head of Mission
- 2011 – 2012; Senior Political Advisor, Directorate General for Strategy and Missions, Federal Ministry of Defense, Berlin
- 2012 – 2015: Director Foreign Trade Promotion, Federal Foreign Office, Berlin Division, Federal Foreign Office, Berlin
- 2015 – 2018: German Embassy Dhaka, Ambassador to Bangladesh

== Bibliography ==
- Die Geschichte der United National Party in Sri Lanka, Dissertation Ruprecht-Karls-Universität Heidelberg, Stuttgart 1990, ISBN 3-515-05567-3.
- Mode, Mord und Models, Düsseldorf 1995, ISBN 3-612-25109-0.
- Ankunft in Bukarest, Cologne 2000, ISBN 3-920862-63-5.
- Abschied von Jakarta, Cologne 2001, ISBN 3-920862-34-1.
- Der Unterhändler der Hanse: Ein Hansekrimi, Hamburg 2005, Re-issued version 2012, ISBN 3-434-52815-6.
- Das Silber der Ostsee: Ein Hansekrimi, Hamburg 2006, ISBN 978-3-434-52820-3.

== Awards ==
- Grand Medal of Diplomacy (2021) – Republic of China

== Family ==
Thomas Prinz has five children.
