= Belgium–Taiwan relations =

- Belgium: Taiwan

Belgium–Taiwan relations are the bilateral relations between Belgium (formally the Kingdom of Belgium) and Taiwan (formally the Republic of China).

== History ==
In 2020, Belgium's Chamber of Representatives passed a resolution of support for Taiwan. In 2021, the Flemish Parliament did the same passing a resolution in support of Taiwan with 117 votes in favor, no votes in opposition, and four abstentions.

In 2024, former Taiwanese President Tsai Ing-wen visited Belgium.

In 2025, the Belgian Chamber of Representatives passed a resolution which criticized China's conduct in the Taiwan Strait and voiced support for Taiwan in the face of growing pressure from China. China had previously warned the Belgian parliament against adopting this measure.

== Commercial relations ==
Flemish wind power companies Jan De Nul and DEME are involved in offshore wind farm development in Taiwan.

In 2025, Matthieu Branders, Belgium's representative in Taiwan, noted that cooperation in the semiconductor sector between the National Science and Technology Council (Taiwan) and Belgium's Interuniversity Microelectronics Centre was the cornerstone of the relationship between the two countries.

== Representative offices ==
=== Taipei Representative Office in Brussels ===
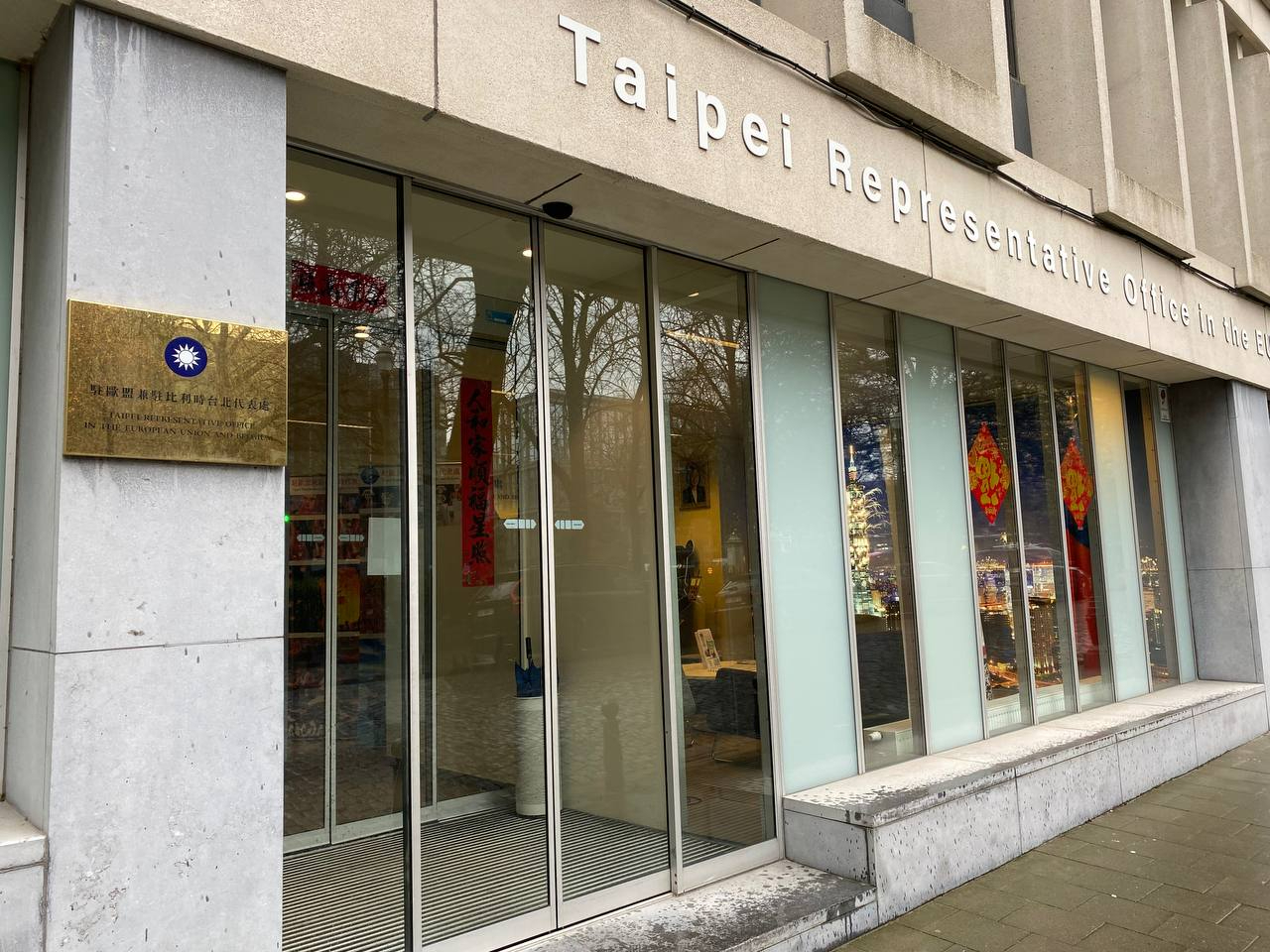
Plaque of the Taipei Representative Office in the EU and Belgium

The Taipei Representative Office in the European Union and Belgium (Chinese: 駐歐盟兼駐比利時代表處; pinyin: Zhù Ōuméng Jiān Zhù Bǐlìshí Dàibiǎo Chù) represents interests of Republic of China (Taiwan) in Belgium, Luxembourg, as well as in the European Union institutions, in the absence of formal diplomatic relations, functioning as a de facto embassy.

It was established in 1976 as the Chambre de Commerce Sino-Belge. It was later renamed Far East Trading Services, Inc.

Since the closure of the Luxembourg City office in 2002, it has also been responsible for relations with Luxembourg. The Luxembourg office had been established in 1975 as the Centre Sun Yat-sen.

Its counterparts in Taiwan are the European Economic and Trade Office, Belgian Office, and the Luxembourg Trade and Investment Office.

== See also ==
- Foreign relations of Belgium
- Foreign relations of Taiwan
- T75 light machine gun
- FN MAG
