= Romania–Taiwan relations =

- Taiwan: Romania

Currently, there are no diplomatic Romania–Taiwan relations. Romania adheres to the One China policy, in line with the policy of most European Union member states. Romania does not maintain official or inter-institutional relations with Taiwan, although it hosts a Taiwan External Trade Development Council (TAITRA) Economic Office. Taiwan's representative office for Romania is located in Budapest, Hungary. In recent years, there has been growing interest in expanding economic and political engagement with Taiwan, although closer relations could potentially strain Romania's relations with the People's Republic of China.

== Background ==
The first known Romanian diplomatic contact with China took place in 1880, when Mihail Kogălniceanu met with a representative of the Qing dynasty in Paris. Romania established diplomatic relations with the Republic of China on 18 October 1939. Relations were severed on 10 July 1941, after Romania recognized the Reorganized National Government of the Republic of China in Nanjing, during the period in which Romania was aligned with the Axis powers.

Following the establishment of the communist regime after the Second World War, Romania adopted a foreign policy increasingly aligned with the Soviet Union and other communist states. After the Chinese Communist victory in 1949, Romania established diplomatic relations with the People's Republic of China on 5 October 1949, becoming the third country to do so.

Following the fall of communist rule in 1989, Romania began to re-establish and expand relations with states with which it had previously maintained limited or adversarial relations, including South Korea. However, Romania continued to maintain its One China policy and did not establish diplomatic relations with Taiwan. This policy has been influenced by Romania's longstanding relationship with the People's Republic of China, which continues to regard Romania as an important partner.

== Rapprochement ==
Although diplomatic relations have not been established, economic and political ties between Romania and Taiwan have continued to develop. Several factors have contributed to this development. First, Romania's membership in the European Union and NATO gives it significance as a potential channel for Taiwan to strengthen engagement with other European and transatlantic partners. Romania's pro-EU and pro-US orientation has further contributed to its importance in this regard.

Economic ties have also contributed to closer relations. Taiwanese companies such as Asustek and Acer operate in Romania, while Green Group, one of Europe's largest recycling companies, was founded by a Taiwanese entrepreneur. Bilateral trade includes Taiwanese exports of semiconductors, routers and integrated circuits, while Romanian exports to Taiwan include wood, tires and steel pipes.

A further proposal has been the creation of a Taiwan–United States–Romania strategic triangle. Although the proposed partnership has yet to be institutionalized, its proponents argue that the close relations of Romania and Taiwan with the United States could provide opportunities for cooperation in technology, trade security and humanitarian policy.

The main obstacle to further development of Romania–Taiwan relations is concern over possible retaliation from mainland China. Although some Romanian politicians see potential economic and political benefits from closer relations with Taiwan, they have remained hesitant to take steps towards normalizing the relationship, owing to concerns over China's response.

Nevertheless, some Romanian parliamentarians have called for the normalization of relations with Taiwan. In September 2025, nine members of the governing parties USR, PNL, PSD and UDMR addressed an open letter to President Nicușor Dan, Prime Minister Ilie Bolojan and Foreign Minister Oana Țoiu, calling for the official opening of relations with Taiwan. The initiative cited Romania's comparatively low level of Taiwanese investment, with the signatories highlighting the substantially higher levels of investment in countries such as Hungary, Czechia and Poland. They also argued that Romania's restrictive interpretation of the One China policy limited political and economic contacts with Taiwan and placed Romania closer in its approach to countries such as Russia, North Korea and Iran.
