= Taipei Representative Office, Berlin =

Taiwanese de facto embassy

Taipei Representative Office in the Federal Republic of Germany 駐德國台北代表處 Taipeh Vertretung in der Bundesrepublik Deutschland
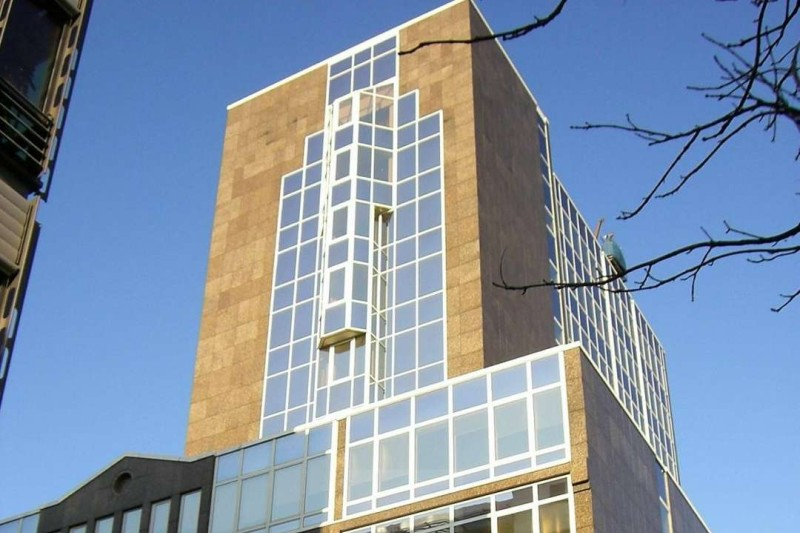
- Taipei Representative Office in Frankfurt

Agency overview
- Formed: 1956 (as Free China Information Service); 1972 (as Far East Information Office); 1992 (as Taipei Economic and Cultural Office); 1997 (as Taipei Representative Office)
- Headquarters: Berlin, Germany
- Agency executive: Klement Ruey-sheng GU, Representative
- Website: Taipeh Vertretung in der Bundesrepublik Deutschland

The Taipei Representative Office in the Federal Republic of Germany; (Chinese: 駐德國台北代表處; pinyin: Zhù Déguó Táiběi Dàibiǎo Chù; German: Taipeh Vertretung in der Bundesrepublik Deutschland) represents the interests of Taiwan in Germany in the absence of formal diplomatic relations, functioning as a de facto embassy, and deals with German–Taiwanese relations.

Based in Berlin, it also has offices in Frankfurt, Hamburg and Munich. Its counterpart in Taiwan is the German Institute, Taipei.

== History ==
The Republic of China was a winning power of World War II and thus dispatched a military mission to occupied Berlin. However, it did not re-establish diplomatic ties with either East or West Germany after the war. Its first in-official office was established in 1956 in Bad Godesberg in Bonn in the then West Germany as the "Free China Press and Information Service" (Freichina- Presse und Informationsdienst), later in 1972 becoming the "Far East Information Office" (Büro der Fernost-Informationen).

In 1992, it became the "Taipei Economic and Cultural Office" (Taipei Wirtschafts- und Kulturbüro). In 1997, it adopted its present name. In October 1999, the Taipei Representative Office moved to Berlin, and offices in Frankfurt, Hamburg and Munich were established. There is also a Taiwan Trade Center in Düsseldorf.

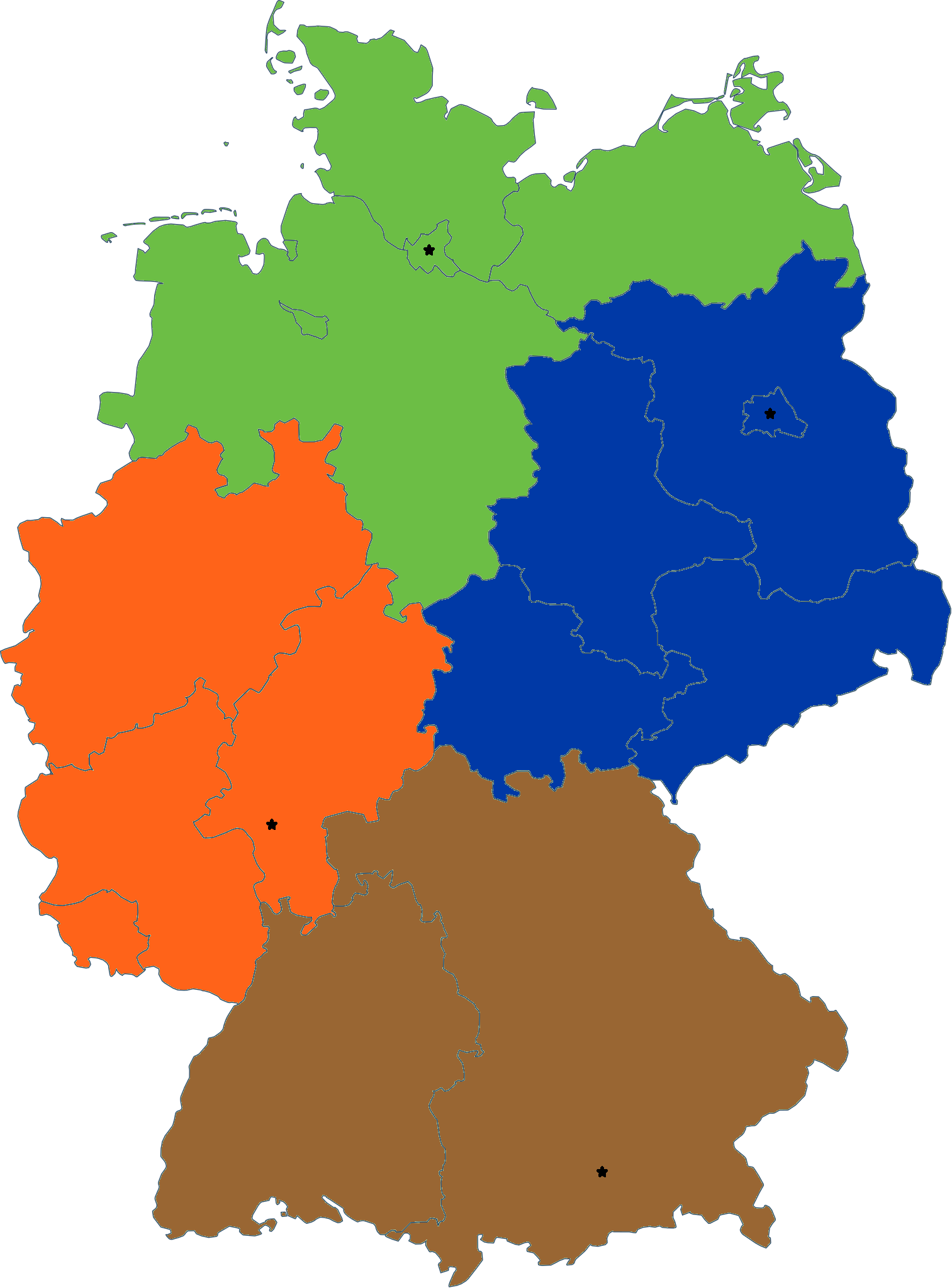

== Missions and consular districts ==
Mission	Consular district
Taipei Representative Office in Germany	Berlin, Brandenburg, Saxony, Saxony-Anhalt, Thuringia
Frankfurt Office	North Rhine-Westphalia, Hesse, Rhineland-Palatinate, Saarland
Hamburg Office	Hamburg, Bremen, Lower Saxony, Schleswig-Holstein, Mecklenburg-Vorpommern
Munich Office	Bavaria, Baden-Württemberg

== Representatives ==
- Agnes Hwa-Yue Chen
- Shieh Jhy-wey (2016-2025)
- Klement Ruey-sheng GU (2025-)

== See also ==
- Germany-Taiwan relations
- Foreign relations of Germany
- Foreign relations of Taiwan
- Foreign policy of Germany
- List of diplomatic missions of Germany
- List of diplomatic missions in Taiwan
- Political status of Taiwan
