= Taipei Representative Office, Brussels =

Taiwanese de facto embassy

Taipei Representative Office in the European Union and Belgium
- 駐歐盟兼駐比利時代表處
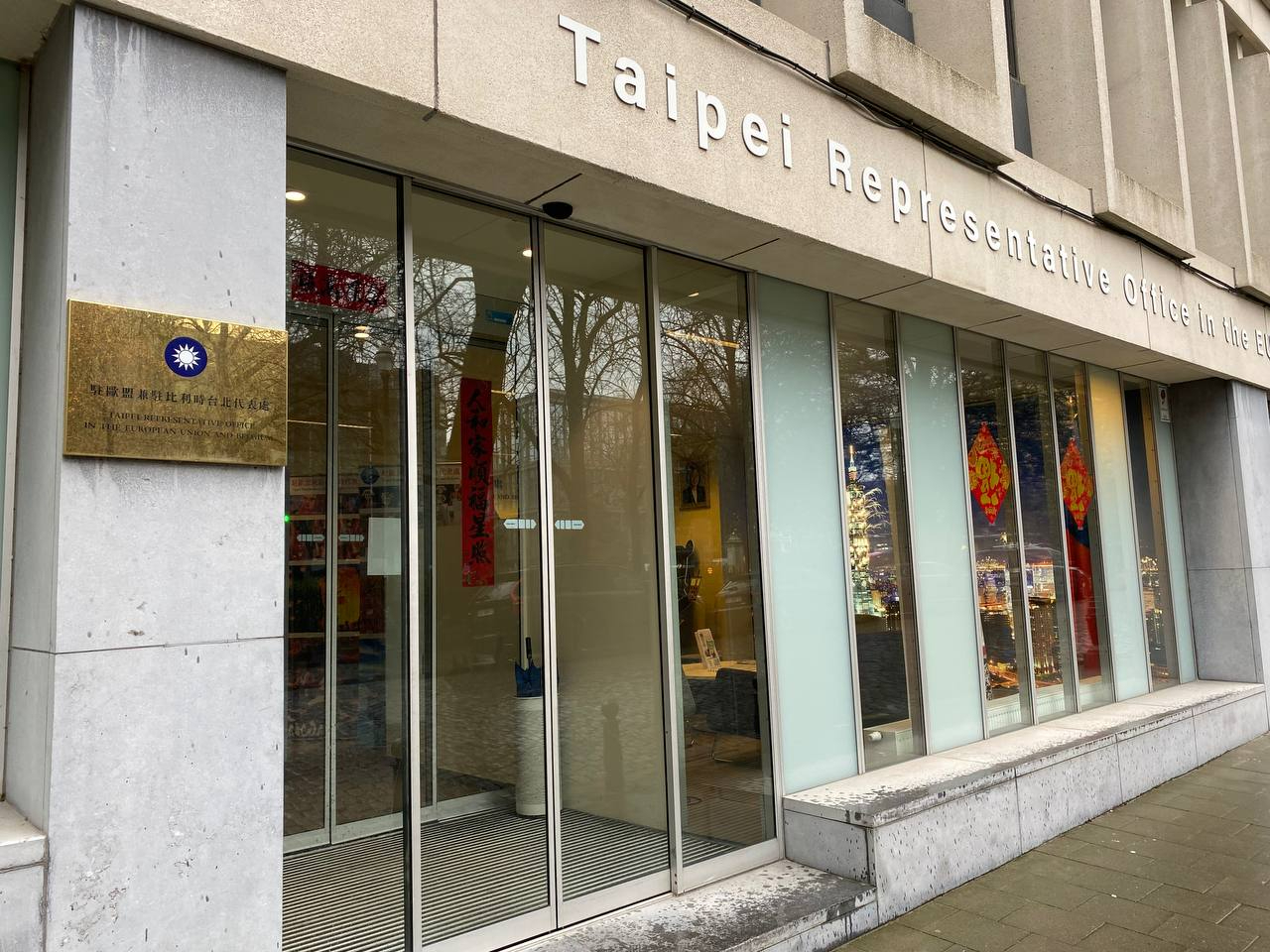
- Plaque of the Taipei Representative Office in the EU and Belgium

Agency overview
- Formed: 1976 (as Chambre de Commerce Sino-Belge)
- Jurisdiction: European Union; Belgium; Luxembourg
- Headquarters: Square de Meeûs 26-27 Brussels, Belgium
- Agency executive: Shieh Jhy-wey, Representative
- Website: www.roc-taiwan.org/be_en

The Taipei Representative Office in the European Union and Belgium (Chinese: 駐歐盟兼駐比利時代表處; pinyin: Zhù Ōuméng Jiān Zhù Bǐlìshí Dàibiǎo Chù) represents interests of Republic of China (Taiwan) in Belgium, Luxembourg, as well as in the European Union institutions, in the absence of formal diplomatic relations, functioning as a de facto embassy.

It was established in 1976 as the Chambre de Commerce Sino-Belge. It was later renamed Far East Trading Services, Inc.

Since the closure of the Luxembourg City office in 2002, it has also been responsible for relations with Luxembourg. The Luxembourg office had been established in 1975 as the Centre Sun Yat-sen.

Its counterparts in Taiwan are the European Economic and Trade Office, Belgian Office, and the Luxembourg Trade and Investment Office.

== Representatives ==
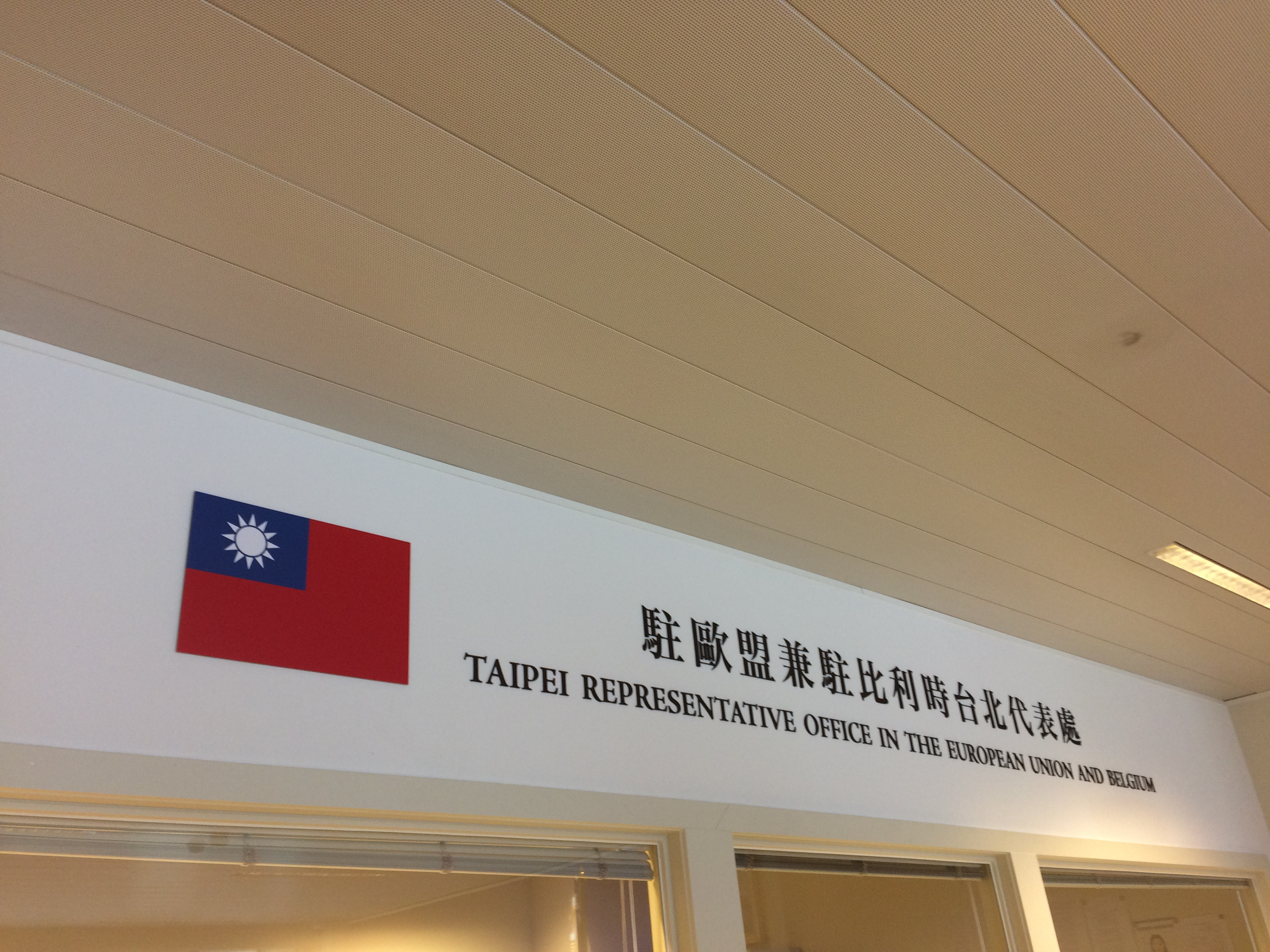
Interior of the Taipei Representative Office.

- Shu Mei-sheng (1971–1990)
- Benjamin Lu (1991–1994)
- Huang Yen-chao (1995–2001)
- David Lee (2001–2004)
- Chen Chien-jen (2004–2006)
- Michael Kau (2006–2008)
- Shen Lyu-shun (2008–2009)
- David Lin (2010–2012)
- Tung Kuo-yu (2013–2017)
- Tseng Hou-jen (2017–2020)
- Tsai Ming-yen (2020–2022)
- Remus Li-Kuo Chen (2022-2023)
- Alexander Tah-ray Yui (2023)
- Roy Chun Lee (2024-2025)
- Shieh Jhy-wey (since 2025)

== See also ==
- Taiwan–European Union relations
- List of diplomatic missions of Taiwan
- List of diplomatic missions in Belgium
- Belgium–Taiwan relations
