= Journal of Graph Algorithms and Applications =

- Discipline: Graph algorithms
- Language: English
- Edited by: Emilio Di Giacomo and Martin Nöllenburg

Publication details
- History: 1997–present
- Publisher: Brown University
- Open access: Yes
- License: CC BY 4.0

Standard abbreviations
- ISO 4: J. Graph Algorithms Appl.

Indexing
- ISSN: 1526-1719
- LCCN: 2007208750
- OCLC no.: 605074748

Links
- Journal homepage; Current Issue

The Journal of Graph Algorithms and Applications is a diamond open access peer-reviewed scientific journal covering the subject of graph algorithms and graph drawing. The journal was established in 1997 and the current co-editors-in-chief are Emilio Di Giacomo (University of Perugia) and Martin Nöllenburg (TU Wien). It is published by Brown University and is a member of the Free Journal Network. It is abstracted and indexed by Scopus and MathSciNet.
