= Shieh Jhy-wey =

Taiwanese politician and diplomat

- 謝志偉
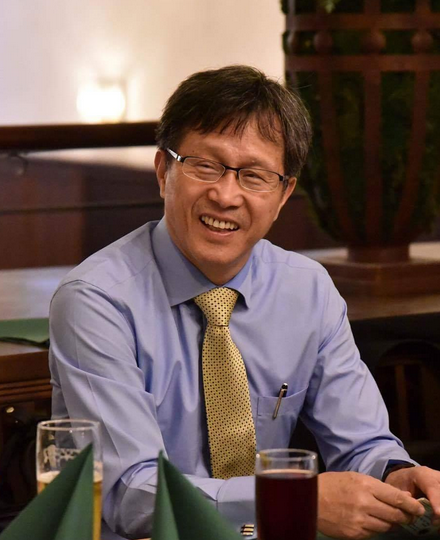
- Shieh in 2016

Taiwanese Representative to the EU and Belgium
- Incumbent
- Assumed office August 2025
- President: Lai Ching-te
- Foreign minister: Lin Chia-lung

Taiwanese Representative to Germany
- Incumbent
- Assumed office 31 August 2016
- President: Tsai Ing-wen
- Foreign minister: David Lee; Joseph Wu
- In office 5 May 2005 – 11 June 2007
- President: Chen Shui-bian
- Foreign minister: Mark Chen; James C. F. Huang
- Succeeded by: You Ching

Director-General of Government Information Office
- In office 11 June 2007 – 19 May 2008
- President: Chen Shui-bian
- Preceded by: Cheng Wen-tsan
- Succeeded by: Vanessa Shih

Personal details
- Born: January 6, 1955 (age 71) Keelung, Taiwan
- Party: Democratic Progressive Party
- Education: Soochow University (BA); Fu Jen Catholic University; Ruhr University Bochum (PhD)

Shieh Jhy-wey (Chinese: 謝志偉; pinyin: Xie Zhiwei; Wade–Giles: Hsieh^{4} Chih^{4}-wei^{3}; born on January 6, 1955) is a Taiwanese politician and diplomat who is currently the Taiwanese Representative to the EU and Belgium, serving since August 2025. Previously, he served as Taiwanese Representative to Germany from 2016 to 2025, and as director-general of Government Information Office from 2007 to 2008.

== Early life and education ==
Shieh was born in Keelung, Taiwan, in 1955. After attending Banqiao Senior High School, he graduated from Soochow University in 1977 with a Bachelor of Arts in the German language and obtained a Master of Arts in German studies from Fu Jen Catholic University in 1980. He then received a German Academic Exchange Service scholarship to pursue doctoral studies in Germany. He earned his Ph.D. in German literature from Ruhr University Bochum in 1987.

After returning to Taiwan in 1987, Shieh participated in various activist movements such as Wild Lily student movement.

Shieh was formerly dean of Soochow University's School of Foreign Languages and Cultures.

== Political career ==
=== Representative to Germany ===
In 2005, Shieh was appointed Taiwanese Representative to Germany, serving from May 2005 to June 2007. An official who worked with Shieh recounted, "On one occasion Shieh selected a crowded street corner. Standing there, he began to introduce himself to people in fluent German and tried hard to bring their attention to Taiwan-related issues."

=== Government Information Office ===
The DPP government had previously approached Shieh to head up the Government Information Office (GIO) in 2002, a cabinet-level agency in charge of promoting government policies and regulating domestic media, but Shieh turned down the invitation. In 2007, Shieh accepted the appointment as director-general of the GIO and was in the role from 2007 to 2008.

Two years after Shieh's tenure as director-general, then Kuomintang-led Control Yuan impeached Shieh for allegedly misusing the GIO budget for the promotion of Taiwan's UN membership bid. Subsequently, the Judicial Yuan's Committee for the Discipline of Civil Servants determined that there was no violation, and that the use of funds for "UN for Taiwan" advertisements was appropriate for Shieh's office.

=== Representative to Germany, 2nd tenure ===
In 2016, Shieh was again appointed representative to Germany. In 2020, he attended the launch ceremony of Freundeskreis Bayern-Taiwan (English: Bavaria–Taiwan Friendship Association), a Taiwan-friendly group in the Bavarian State Parliament. In addition to Shieh, the ceremony was also attended by members of the ruling Christian Social Union and Free Voters, the opposition Social Democrats, among others. Earlier in the year, the European Affairs Committee in the parliament had previously passed a resolution to support Taiwan's bid for participation in the World Health Organization as an observer.

In 2021, at the height of the COVID-19 pandemic, Shieh signed a bilateral agreement with Germany to facilitate direct flights from Taiwan to Munich.

In March 2023, German Minister of Education and Research Bettina Stark-Watzinger visited Taiwan, the first time any German federal minister had made such a visit in 26 years. During this visit, the Chinese foreign ministry filed a protest with Germany about her "vile conduct." In response to a reporter, Stark-Watzinger said that the visit was "not connected with [the federal government's China strategy]." In Stark-Watzinger's presence, Shieh, representing Taiwan, signed a scientific and technological cooperation agreement with his German counterpart Jörg Polster, as the two countries arrange partnerships in AI, semiconductors, lithium batteries, and green energy development.

Later in 2023, Germany and Taiwan signed an agreement on judicial cooperation and another on civil exchange.

=== Representative to Belgium and the European Union ===
On 1 August 2025, Shieh stepped down as representative to Germany and later that month assumed a new role as representative to Belgium and the European Union. Gu Ruey-sheng succeeded Shieh as representative to Germany.

== Personal life ==
Shieh is married to Wang Lin-hui and has two daughters.

In response to China's 2021 blacklist of sanctioned Taiwanese politicians labeled "Taiwan independence stubborn individuals" (台獨頑固份子) that included Foreign Minister Joseph Wu, Premier Su Tseng-chang, President of the Legislative Yuan You Si-kun, Shieh lamented that he was left off of the list. Citing his "years of defending Taiwanese sovereignty, freedom, and democracy," he asked the Taiwan Affairs Office to add him to the list.

== Selected works ==
- Shieh, Jhy-wey (2017). "Walking by Night - Shedding Light on a Motif as the ´Aftermath´ of Disenchantment". Interface Journal of European Languages and Literatures. 3 (3): 5–34. doi:10.6667/interface.3.2017.42.
