= Jörg Polster =

German diplomat (born 1962)

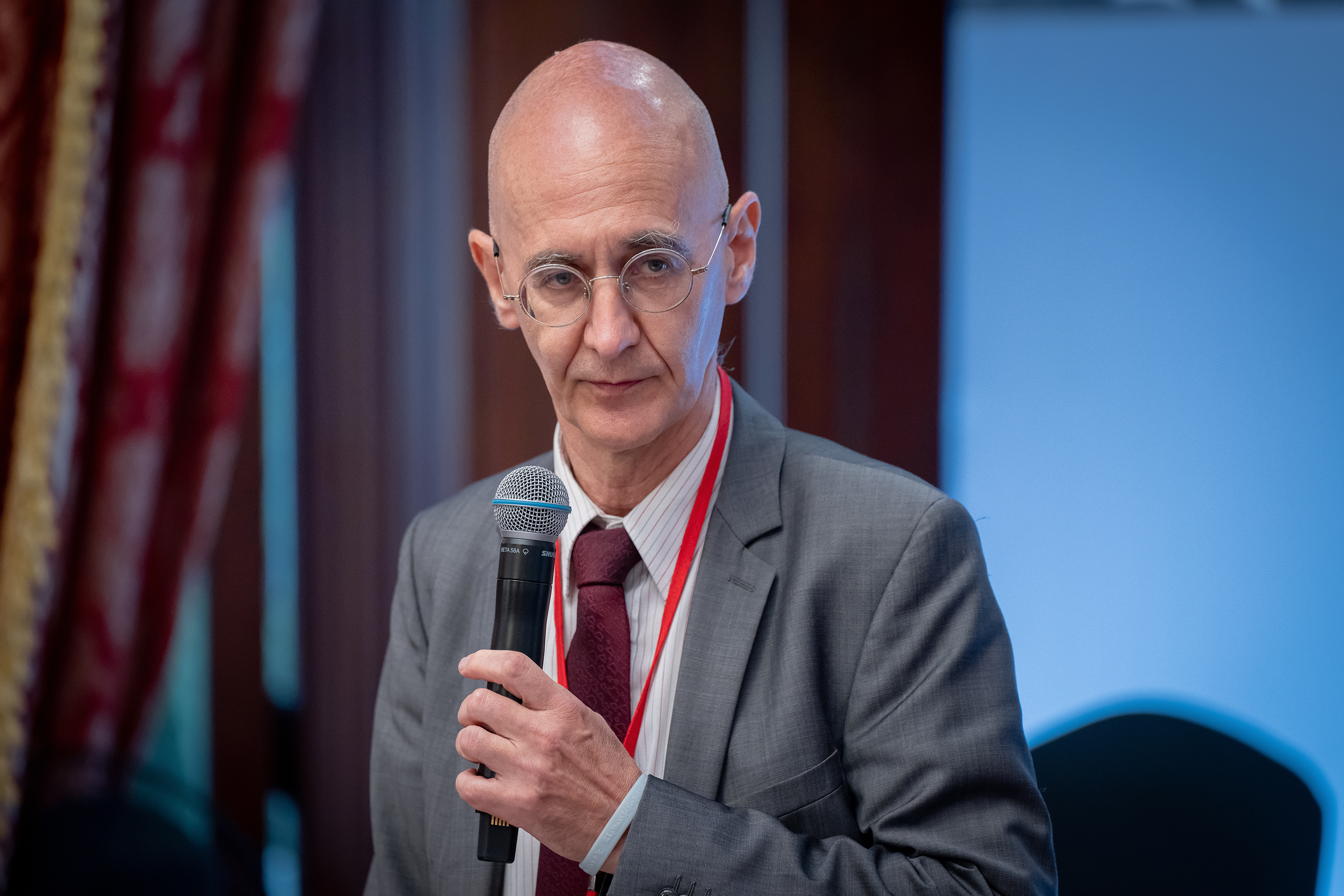
Jörg Polster (2023)

Jörg Wolfram Polster (born 1962 in Weida) is a German diplomat, who is the former Director General of the German Institute, Taipei.

== Life ==
Polster received his doctorate in 1990 at the Technische Universität Dresden in physics. In 1991 he started his two-year-long attaché training for the Senior Foreign Service in the Federal Foreign Office. Afterwards he worked at various posts in the headquarters of the Federal Foreign Office as well as at the German Embassy, Seoul (South Korea), the German Institute, Taipei (Taiwan), the German Embassy, Hanoi (Vietnam), the German Embassy, Washington (United States), German Embassy, Caracas (Venezuela) and German Embassy, New Delhi (India).

Since July 2021 he has been Director General of the German Institute in Taipei, the German presence in the country, which effectively performs the role of a diplomatic representation.

In the summer of 2025, Karsten Tietz succeeded Jörg Polster as Director General of the German Institute in Taipei.
