= International Council for Information Technology in Government Administration =

The International Council for Information Technology in Government Administration (ICA) is a non-profit making organisation which promotes the information exchange of knowledge, ideas and experiences between central government information technology authorities.

The ICA was established in 1968.
