= German Institute, Taipei =

Representative mission in Taiwan

Coordinates: 25°2′1″N 121°33′52″E

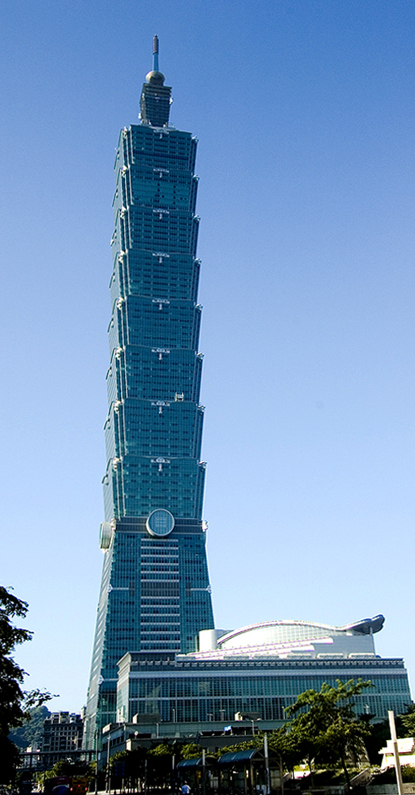
- Taipei 101, in which the German Institute is located.
- Founded: 2000
- Type: Overseas representative office
- Location: 33rd floor, Taipei 101, Xinyi District, Taipei
- Region served: Republic of China (Taiwan)
- Director General: Karsten Tietz
- Website: German Institute Taipei

The German Institute Taipei (German: Deutsches Institut Taipei; Chinese: 德國在台協會) is the overseas representative office of Germany in Taiwan, which promotes the non-diplomatic German-Taiwanese relations and looks after German interests there.

Tasks of the institution include the increasing of bilateral cooperation (especially in the field of culture and economy), dealing with consular affairs like visa or passport, providing a variety of services for German citizens in Taiwan and German-related information to Taiwanese people. In some instances, it maintains contacts with Taiwanese government on behalf of the Federal Republic of Germany, acting as a de facto embassy. The institute's affairs are led by a Director General, who acts as the German representative to Taiwan.

Its counterpart in Germany is the Taipei Representative Office in Berlin.

== List of directors general ==
No.	Photo	Name	Tenure
1		Klaus Rupprecht	2000 – 2002
2		Ulrich Dreesen	2002 – 2005
3		Detlef Boldt	2005 – 2008
4		Birgitt Ory	2008 – 2011
5		Michael Zickerick	2011 – 2014
6		Martin Eberts	2014 – 2018
7		Thomas Prinz	2018 –2021
8		Jörg Polster	2021 – 2025
9		Karsten Tietz	2025 –

== List of deputy directors general ==
No.	Photo	Name	Tenure
		Jörg Polster	2000s
		Helmut Lüders	2003-2006
		Pit Köhler	?-2010
		Mirko Kruppa	2010-2014
		Sabrina Schmidt-Koschella	2014-2020
		Dagmar Traub-Evans	2020-

== See also ==
- Germany-Taiwan relations
- Foreign policy of Germany
- Foreign relations of Germany
- Foreign relations of Taiwan
- List of diplomatic missions of Germany
- List of diplomatic missions in Taiwan
