= European Economic and Trade Office in Taiwan =

Political representative office in Xinyi, Taipei, Taiwan

Coordinates: 25°02′04.0″N 121°33′40.3″E

- 歐洲經貿辦事處

Agency overview
- Formed: 10 March 2003
- Jurisdiction: Republic of China
- Headquarters: Xinyi, Taipei, Taiwan
- Agency executive: Lutz Güllner, Head of Office
- Parent agency: European External Action Service
- Website: European Economic and Trade Office in Taiwan

The European Economic and Trade Office in Taiwan (EETO; Chinese: 歐洲經貿辦事處; pinyin: Ōuzhōu Jīngmào Bànshì Chù) is the representative office of European Union (EU) in Taiwan. Its counterpart body in the EU is the Taipei Representative Office in the EU and Belgium. The European Union does not have diplomatic ties with the Republic of China (Taiwan) and only maintains informal relations with it.

== History ==
The office was established on 10 March 2003 by the European Commission (Prodi Commission).

== Organizational structure ==
- Trade Section
- Political, Press and Information Section
- Administration Section

== Transportation ==
The office is accessible within walking distance north west of Taipei 101 / World Trade Center Station of the Taipei Metro.

== See also ==
- Taiwan–European Union relations
- List of diplomatic missions in Taiwan
- List of diplomatic missions of the European Union
- Foreign relations of Taiwan
