= Fang Zhouzi =

Chinese science writer

- 方舟子
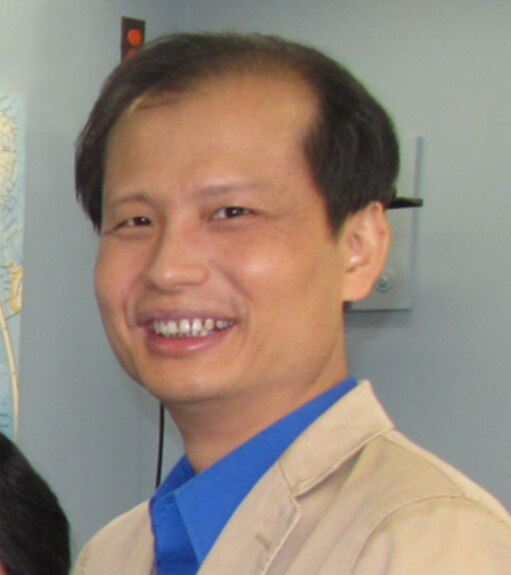
- Fang in 2012
- Born: Fang Shimin; September 28, 1967 (age 59); Yunxiao County, Fujian, China
- Education: University of Science and Technology of China (B.S.); Michigan State University (Ph.D.)
- Occupations: Science writer, reporter
- Known for: President of New Threads website on Chinese culture Anti-fraud campaign
- Spouse: Liu Juhua
- Awards: John Maddox Prize

Fang Shimin (Chinese: 方是民; Pe̍h-ōe-jī: Puiⁿ Sī-bîn / Png Sī-bîn), better known by his pen name Fang Zhouzi (Chinese: 方舟子; pinyin: Fāng Zhōuzǐ; Pe̍h-ōe-jī: Puiⁿ Chiu-chú / Png Chiu-chú; born 28 September 1967), is a Chinese popular science writer and co-founder of New Threads (simplified Chinese: 新语丝; traditional Chinese: 新語絲; Pe̍h-ōe-jī: Sin-gí-si), a popular science publication and website. Fang is known for his campaigns against pseudoscience and fraud in China, which have led to high-profile feuds with figures such as Han Han and Luo Yonghao and have also drawn accusations of vigilantism and populism. After criticizing Zhou Xiaoping in 2014 and subsequently being blacklisted by the Chinese government, Fang has lived in the United States.

== Biography ==
Fang Zhouzi (real name Fang Shimin) was born in Zhangzhou, Fujian, China, in September 1967. Fang stated that his pen name, "Fang Zhouzi", is derived from a classical Chinese expression for "two ships sailing together"; in his case, the two ships stand for science and literature. Fang graduated from University of Science and Technology of China in 1990 and enrolled in Michigan State University, where he obtained a Ph.D. in biochemistry in 1995. Fang then worked at various institutions as a postdoctoral researcher in molecular genetics.

In the summer of 2010, after Fang questioned the efficacy of his surgical procedure and the accuracy of his curriculum vitae, urologist Xiao Chuanguo hired thugs to assault Fang in Beijing. Fang escaped with only minor cuts and bruises, but believed it was an attempt to kill him. Xiao had sued Fang for libel five times in the past five years, winning one case, losing two and two further being undecided. The dispute between Fang and Xiao dated to the founding of the New Threads website, when Fang had used the website to question the accuracy of Xiao's application to the Chinese Academy of Sciences.

Fang is married to Liu Juhua, a senior reporter at the state-controlled Xinhua News Agency. Fang is a permanent resident of the United States. When in the United States, he lives in San Diego.

== Campaign against fraud ==
Fang is an active campaigner against what he perceives as fraud in the Chinese society. His anti-fraud efforts initially targeted academics, but later expanded to public figures in general.

=== Academia ===
Fang is famous for his website, New Threads (established in 2001), that discusses poor-quality science in China and his efforts to expose poor scientific work, fraud and increase the profile of research ethics in China have received wide coverage. Within the country there is no official body or procedure to handle complaints or examine allegations of fraud, and Fang started the website as an unofficial platform to expose instances. In 2006, a series of accusations and counter-accusations on Fang's website lead to significant media attention, criticisms of the self-conducted investigations by Chinese universities, and greater involvement by independent investigative bodies such as the Ministry of Science, Chinese Academy of Sciences or the National Natural Science Foundation of China in investigating allegations; though these institutions already have a role in investigating academic misconduct though their involvement is seen as ineffective. In 2012 Fang shared the inaugural John Maddox Prize, given out by Nature and Sense about Science to "individuals who have promoted sound science and evidence on a matter of public interest, with an emphasis on those who have faced difficulty or opposition in doing so." The announcement of Fang's presentation summarized his contributions, saying:

As an outsider, trained as a biochemist but turned science writer and commentator, [Fang] has done much of what the scientific community aims, but often fails, to do — root out the fakers.

For example, Fang called into question DNA supplements that were widely advertised as a means to rejuvenate the tired, the pregnant and the old. Eventually, the government issued warnings about the supplements. Fang seemed to especially relish smacking down powerful or popular scientists. He even challenged official support of traditional Chinese medicine. But his targets fought back, in one case with particular hostility. ...

Fang imposes transparency on an opaque system. He has opened a forum for criticism and debate in a community that is otherwise devoid of it.

In a 2010 article in The New York Times, Fang ascribed the problems with Chinese scientific integrity to the university system being run by state bureaucrats with little or no knowledge of the fields they administer, who base their decisions regarding research grants and career advancements on the number of scientific publications found, rather than their quality, where or if they were published. According to Fang, other problems include fellow researchers who protect their peers, sometimes due to personal connections and sometimes due to a fear of being exposed themselves. As of 2010 Fang's website had listed over 900 examples of academic fraud, which included presidents of universities and nationally known researchers.

=== Nonscientists ===
Fang has also accused nonscientists of fraud and plagiarism. Fang questioned the qualifications and degrees of high-profile Chinese businessman Tang Jun, the former president of MSN China, who acquired his PhD degree from a diploma mill rather than the claimed California Institute of Technology. He also questioned former Google China president Kai-Fu Lee's intention for stating he was an associate professor at CMU in the Chinese version of his autobiography, while being actually an assistant professor. Lee responded by attributing the error to "nuances lost in translation". Fang has accused Li Qun, a local Chinese official responsible for enforcing China's one-child policy, of falsely claiming to have worked for New Haven, Connecticut mayor John DeStefano Jr., and blogger, author and race-car driver Han Han of having his father ghost-writing for him, though Han denied the accusations. In January 2012, Fang accused Ping Fu, the Chinese-born American CEO of Geomagic, of fabricating stories in her memoir Bend, Not Break. In response, Fu posted a series of corrections and clarifications. Fang continued to make personal attacks on Fu, and later expanded his criticism to American media, calling the Daily Beast "the shame of American journalism" by making what he considered as a biased report.

=== Criticism ===
Despite the intent to scrutinize and improve the honesty of scientific research in China, Fang's actions have been criticized for lacking transparency that would allow proper investigations. Many of the roughly 100 allegations posted on Fang's website each year are anonymous and lack details, and those accused have been unable to respond as a result. On 8 May 2006, Fu Xinyuan, an Indiana University professor of immunology, published an open letter, signed by 120 overseas Chinese scholars, that called for due process and presumption of innocence in Chinese academic corruption cases. Furthermore, the letter criticized the practice of using populist rhetoric and personal attacks to affect institutional investigations. Although the letter did not explicitly mention Fang Zhouzi or his New Threads website, it was widely received as a rebuttal to Fang's campaigns. Fang denied Fu Xinyuan's claims, calling Fu's letter "contrary to the spirit of free speech". On 25 May 2006, Nature published a discussion of Fang's work, stating that while Fang's website had started a debate regarding academic integrity and scientific misconduct in China, areas where the country has admitted to "serious problems", the anonymous nature of the accusations posted on Fang's website reminded some of the similarly anonymous accusations that led to persecution of "government enemies" during the Cultural Revolution. Fang replied the Nature article, claiming that it is "absurd to compare Internet freedom of speech to the Cultural Revolution".

== Controversies ==
=== Libel conviction ===
In 2006, Fang was convicted of libel by an Intermediate Court.

=== Plagiarism allegation ===
On March 30, 2011, Beijing-based newspaper Legal Weekly published an investigative report on Fang's alleged plagiarism. It found an article authored by Fang, published in the newspaper Economic Observer and included in two of Fang's books, plagiarized an online article posted in 2001 by Ying He. On a separate issue, Michigan State University professor Robert Root-Bernstein accused that Fang, in an online post in 1995, plagiarized one of his essays published by Oxford University Press. In response, Fang apologized for not crediting Prof. Root-Bernstein in the post, but denied he committed plagiarism or copyright infringement. Soon after, Fang accused Dr. Root-Bernstein of being a former member of a pseudo-science group.

=== Shenzhen TV investigation ===
The television station of Shenzhen, China began airing an investigative report titled Fang Zhouzi Revealed on February 23, 2012. The program examined various controversies surrounding Fang, notably his conflict with Dr. Xiao Chuanguo. Among others, it found that Fang's claim that "Xiao's surgery procedure had a zero success rate" was false, by interviewing patients who successfully underwent the surgery. Fang declined to be interviewed by the station, calling it "shameless". On his Weibo, Fang asked his audience to identify the program's presenter, suggesting she needs to "pay a price". Fang also posted the photo, name and CV of the director of the TV station, calling him to be investigated by authorities. The series was abruptly pulled off air on February 27.

=== Embezzlement allegation ===
On December 22, 2015, Wang Zhian, a China Central Television journalist, embarked upon a series of investigative reports, exposing a suspected fundraising scam that involved Fang Shimin and his lawyer, Peng Jian. Back to September 2, 2010, a 'Security Fund' dedicated to Fang's personal safety was launched. Peng Jian initiated the fundraising project and has been in charge since then. Wang's investigation revealed that the alleged supervisory committee did not fulfill its primary responsibility; the internal auditing was almost in non-existence, and consequently, up to 179,392 yuan was embezzled from the fund to purchase a vehicle for Peng's law firm.

== Views and essays ==
=== Scientific research in China ===
Commenting on the 2012 Nobel Prizes, Fang has stated that while China has made significant advances in technology, but has not caught up to Japan, Europe and the United States in science and research. He stated that he does not expect China to produce a Nobel Prize-winning scientist for the next ten or more years.

=== Religion ===
Fang has strongly criticized Christianity, dedicating a section of his New Threads website to its criticism. In an interview, Fang described the religion as barbaric, violent, and a threat to Western and Chinese culture and Jehovah a "murderous demon". In an essay, he questioned the gospel accounts of the life of Jesus Christ, saying "there is no reliable historical record providing evidence that Jesus of Nazareth ever existed". Upon learning two teenage students died in a plane crash were heading for a summer camp organized by a Christian school, Fang commented: "why didn't (their) God protect them?"

Fang has also criticized Li Yi, a Taoist monk known for allegedly magical feats, for taking advantage of the poor public health infrastructure in China by claiming he could improve people's health.

Fang was the earliest critic of Falun Gong, a spiritual practice that was later banned in China.

=== Environmental Issues ===
Fang is an ardent supporter of the use of genetically modified food, writing articles and producing a series of lectures debunking the perceived risks and misinformation surrounding GMF.

Fang vehemently denounces Greenpeace as an "anti-scientific organization", "a pseudo-environmental group".

=== Traditional Chinese medicine ===
Fang asserted that Traditional Chinese medicine is superstitious pseudoscience and referred to its practitioners as "charlatans". He is one of the most vocal contemporary critics of TCM in China. Fang published a book systematically debunking TCM's theory and practice.

== Awards ==
In November 2012, Fang was joint winner, with Simon Wessely, of the combined Nature and Sense about Science inaugural John Maddox Prize for standing up for science.
