= Fu Ping =

Fu Ping may refer to:

- Fu-Ping, or Fubing system, local militia system existing in China between 6th century and 8th century
- Ping Fu (born 1958), Chinese-American computer scientist and businesswoman
