= DSSP =

DSSP may refer to:

- DSSP (hydrogen bond estimation algorithm), an algorithm that determines the secondary structure of protein subsequences from the coordinates of a protein structure
- DSSP (imaging), a method of scanning objects into 3D digital representations
- DSSP (programming), a programming language, acronym for Dialog System for Structured Programming
- Decentralized Software Services Protocol, a SOAP-based protocol used by Microsoft Robotics Developer Studio
- Deep Submergence Systems Project, US Navy program to develop methods of rescuing submarines
- Dessert spoon, a spoon with a capacity of about 2 teaspoons
- Digital Solid State Propulsion, American aerospace company
