= Bend, Not Break =

Book by Ping Fu

Bend, Not Break: A Life in Two Worlds
- 2012 first edition hardcover
- Author: Ping Fu, MeiMei Fox
- Subject: Memoir
- Genre: Non-fiction
- Publisher: Portfolio Hardcover
- English publication date: December 31, 2012
- Pages: 288 pages
- ISBN: 1591845521

Bend, Not Break: A Life in Two Worlds is a 2012 memoir by Ping Fu, with co-author MeiMei Fox. The book tells stories from Fu's life, starting with her childhood in China at the dawn of the Cultural Revolution, and continuing through her role as co-founder and CEO of Geomagic, a 3D graphics software development company in the United States. The book was first published in English on December 31, 2012, through Portfolio Hardcover.

Several weeks after publication, the book became the focus of controversy over claims by Chinese bloggers, and commenters from both China and America, that Fu had exaggerated or falsified some of the stories from her life in China. Fu has denied falsifying her stories, but has acknowledged some errors in the book, and has committed to correcting them in the next printing.

== Synopsis ==
The book narrates the life of Ping Fu, a computer scientist from China. Fu spent her early years caring for her younger sister after her parents were taken away for re-education through labor, as well as working in factories and spending time in the military. After the end of the Cultural Revolution, Fu attended Suzhou Teacher's College, where she was later deported to the United States for the contents of her thesis. Once in America, Fu worked her way through college in a variety of jobs and eventually gained a BA in Computer Science & Economics through the University of California, San Diego. From there she worked for the National Center for Supercomputing Applications and later formed Geomagic.

== Reception ==
Critical reception for Bend, Not Break was initially positive, with The Christian Science Monitor calling it an "inspiring and energetic tale of how a scared little girl learned to draw down hard on her inner resources and build on every small kindness that came her way". The book has garnered positive reviews from Publishers Weekly, Kirkus Reviews, and Oprah.com, with the Oprah.com reviewer stating that it was "devastating and transformative". A journalist for the China Daily heavily criticized the book, commenting that "The book may have its truthful elements, but to most Chinese readers it seems that the majority of the facts have been bent too much to be believable."

Consumer reaction has varied, with the book's Amazon rating decreasing dramatically after controversy over the book's content gained media attention. The Daily Beast credits the numerous one-star Amazon ratings and the wider internet attacks to "internet vigilantes."

Bend, Not Break has received criticism over some of its content, with some detractors questioning the validity and truthfulness of some passages and making Fu the subject of a Human Flesh Search campaign. Some Chinese readers brought up several inconsistencies between claims made in the book and things Fu had mentioned in interviews, particularly those concerning her early years. Author and scientist Fang Zhouzi voiced disbelief over a claim in the book that Fu had witnessed a teacher get "torn apart by four horses", saying that there was "no evidence to suggest that such a barbaric act ever took place" and considered it "an unlikely practice at that time in China’s history".

Fu has defended herself against the accusations and acknowledged that some details were inaccurate, but did not do so intentionally and that some portions were changed through the suggestion of her co-author and editors. She later posted an article on the Huffington Post clarifying several of the book's elements that Zhouzi and others claimed were false. Adrian Zackheim, president of Portfolio Hardcover, has defended Fu and the book, stating that he had "absolute confidence" and further stated "I have no doubts that the book is substantially correct and that attempts to pick apart elements of it are political attacks."
