= Lutz Michael Wegner =

German computer scientist

Lutz M. Wegner
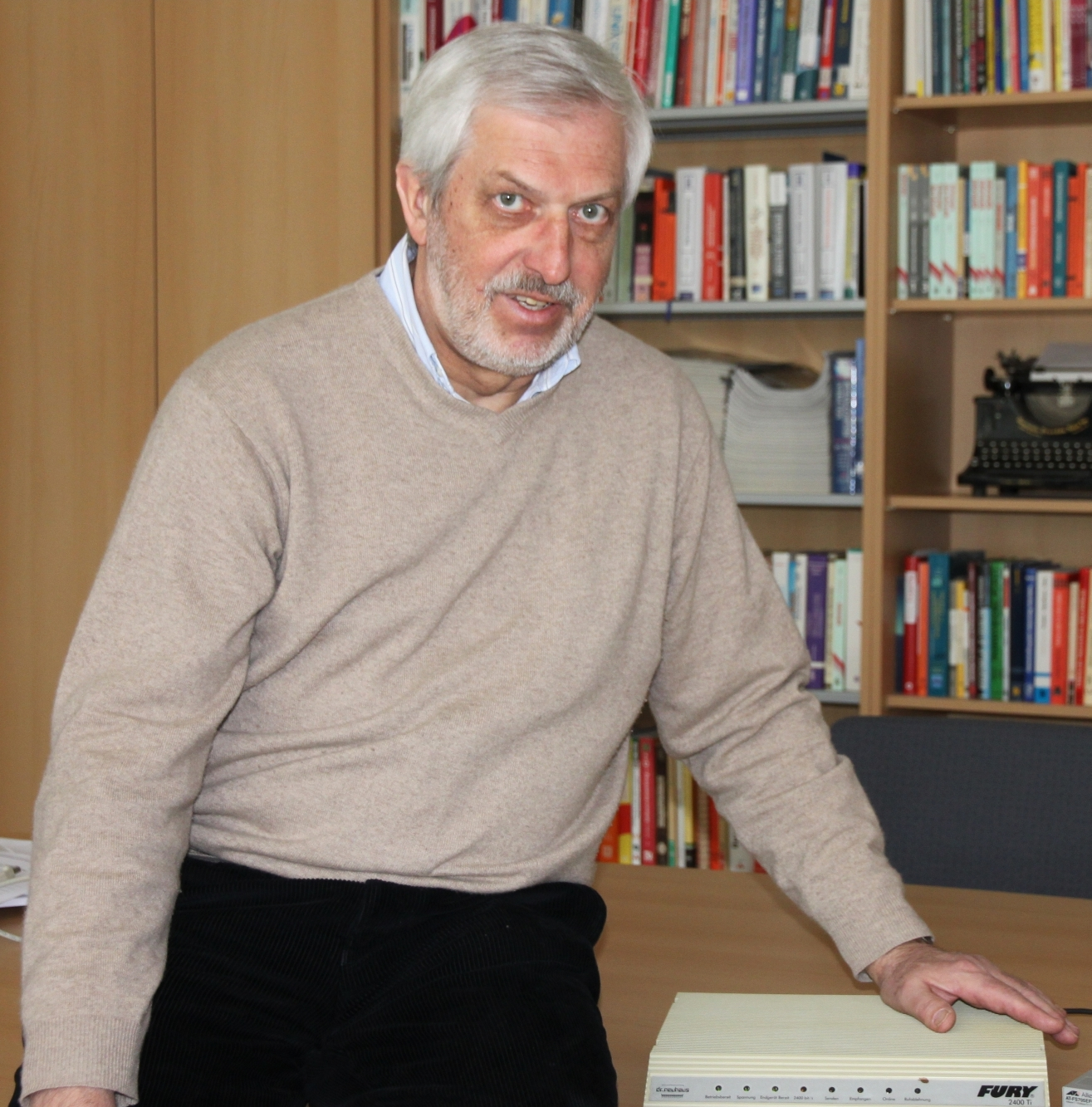
- Born: October 11, 1949 (age 76); Weinsberg, Germany
- Citizenship: Germany
- Education: University of Karlsruhe
- Known for: Two-level grammar, sorting, multisets
- Scientific career
- Fields: Computer Science
- Workplaces: University of Kassel
- Thesis: Analysis of two-level grammars (1977)
- Doctoral advisor: Hermann Maurer

Lutz Michael Wegner (born October 11, 1949) is a German computer scientist.

== Biography ==
Wegner was born in Weinsberg near Heilbronn, Germany, in 1949. He graduated from Williston Academy in Easthampton, Mass. in 1968 and from Theodor-Heuss-Gymnasium in Heilbronn in 1969. From 1969 to 1974 he studied industrial engineering at the University of Karlsruhe finishing with an MBA to be followed by two years as a visiting Ph.D. student at the Department of Computer Science of the University of British Columbia in Vancouver, B.C., Canada. His thesis titled "Analysis of two-level grammars" was submitted and defended in Karlsruhe in 1977 with Hermann Maurer and Thomas Ottmann being the referees. In 1982 he received the venia legendi in applied computer science from the University of Karlsruhe with an inaugural dissertation (Habilitationsschrift) on Quicksort variants for multisets. Examiners were Thomas Ottmann, Wolfgang Janko and Jan van Leeuwen (Utrecht).

In 1984 he was appointed professor at the Hochschule Fulda (Fulda University of Applied Sciences) and went from there in 1987 to the University of Kassel where he served as full professor and chairman of the database group since 1989 until his retirement in March 2015.

== Achievements ==
Lutz Wegner started his career with fundamental research on two-level grammars, also known as van Wijngaarden grammars which had been used to define the programming language Algol68. His results were included in the Handbook of Formal Languages by Arto Salomaa and Grzegorz Rozenberg. For his second thesis he developed variants of Quicksort suitable for multiset and proved that they achieved the lower bound for quicksort algorithms previously given by Robert Sedgewick. Following a sabbatical stay at the IBM Scientific Center Heidelberg he took an interest in the Non-First Normal-Form data model, also known as nested relational model, and designed a graphical editor which also served as base for research on synchronous groupware. In 1986 he authored an E-learning course "Introduction to Unix", which originally was a contribution to Hermann Maurer's COSTOC-Project, and with several portings was in active use until 2015, thus constituting one of the longest running examples of courseware.

Besides his scientific achievements Wegner was instrumental in introducing computer science studies (Bachelor and Master) at the University of Kassel which started in 2001 after securing three additional, sponsored professorships with Traudl Herrhausen, then a member of the Hessian Parliament, opening doors to industry and charities.

== Notable publications ==
- Lutz M. Wegner: On Parsing Two-level Grammars Acta Informatica 14 (1980) pp. 175–193 doi:10.1007/BF00288543
- Lutz M. Wegner: Quicksort for Equal Keys. IEEE Trans. Comput. 34:4 (1985) pp. 362–366 doi:10.1109/TC.1985.5009387.
- Jukka Teuhola and Lutz Wegner: Minimal Space, Average Linear Time Duplicate Deletion. Comm. ACM 34:3 (1991) pp. 62–73 doi:10.1145/102868.102872.

== See also ==
- Two-level grammars
- Quicksort
