= MUPID =

1981 home computer and videotex terminal

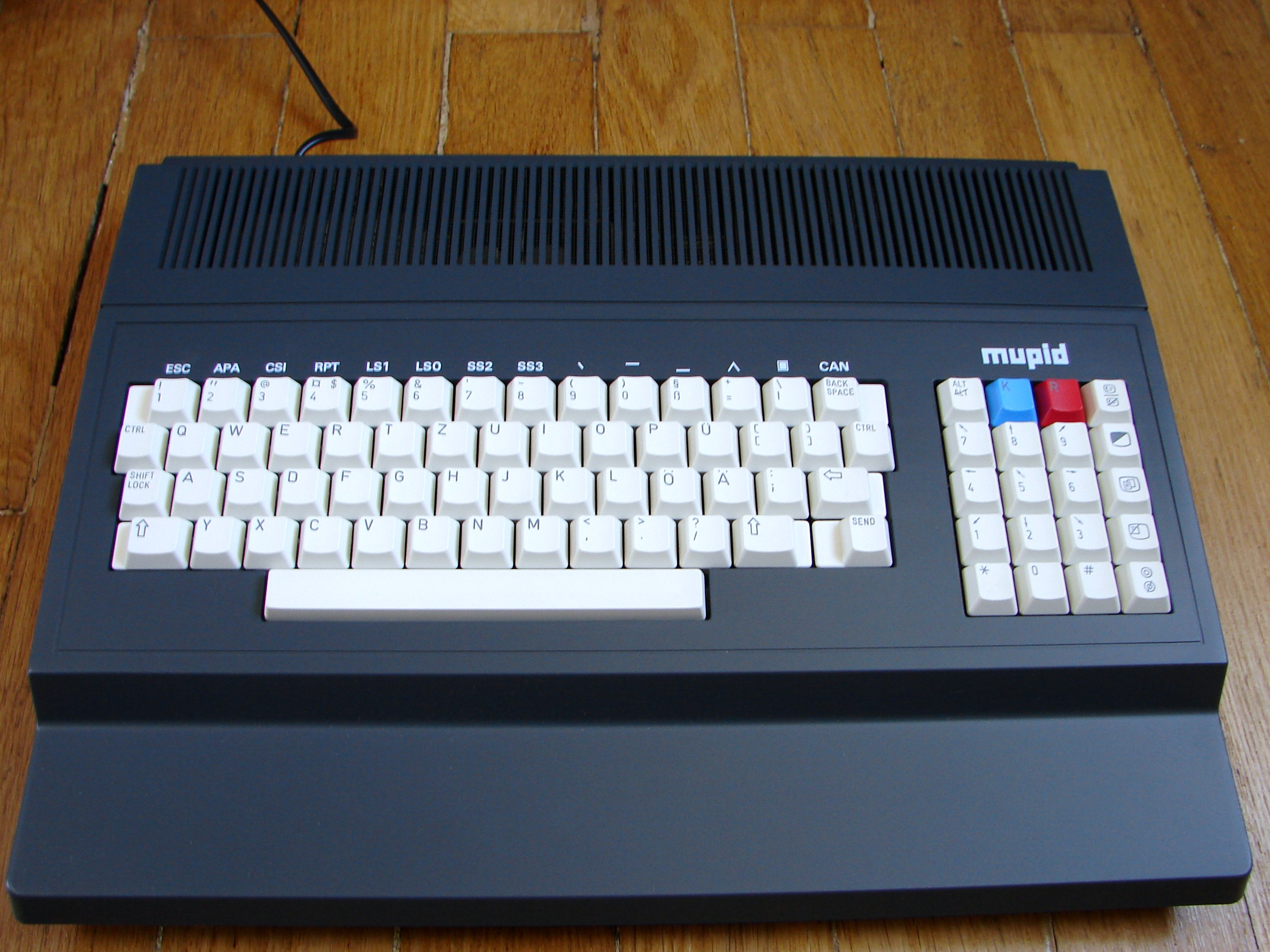
- Mupid C2A2
- Also known as: MUPID A320, MUPID C2D, MUPID C2D2, MUPID C2A2, Komfort MUPID, Grundig PTC 100, Siemens T3110
- Manufacturer: MUPID
- Type: Bildschirmtext terminal, Home computer
- Released: 1981
- Discontinued: 1982
- Media: Cassette tape, 5.25" floppy drive (optional)
- Operating system: BASIC, CP/M (with optional floppy drive)
- CPU: Z80A @ 3 MHz
- Memory: 128 KB (64 KB free)
- Display: RGB video output
- Graphics: 240, 320 or 480 pixels per line, 40 × 25 text mode, 16 colors (from a 4096 color palette)
- Sound: Built-in speaker
- Connectivity: 1200/75 baud modem, audio in/out (for tape recorder), parallel printer interface
- Successor: MUPID II

The MUPID (short for "Mehrzweck Universell Programmierbarer Intelligenter Decoder" in German) or MUPID A320 was an early home computer like system introduced in 1981, designed and invented by Hermann Maurer at TU Graz, Austria to be used as a Bildschirmtext terminal, but it was also capable of being used as a stand-alone computer.

It had a Zilog Z80 microprocessor and came with BASIC as operating system, 128 KB of RAM, a V.24 1200/75 baud modem, audio input/output for tape recorder, a parallel printer interface and an optional external floppy drive unit. At the time it excelled in having advanced color graphic capabilities.

There were several model variations: the MUPID C2D (square case with separate keyboard) and MUPID C2D2 were available in Germany, the MUPID C2A2 or "Komfort MUPID" (later models) were available in Austria.

The Mupid was also sold under other brands, as the Grundig PTC 100 (C2D2 variation in a different color) and the Siemens T3110 (C2D variation).

A card for older IBM PC compatibles with an ISA slot was developed that gave a PC the same graphics capabilities as a MUPID.

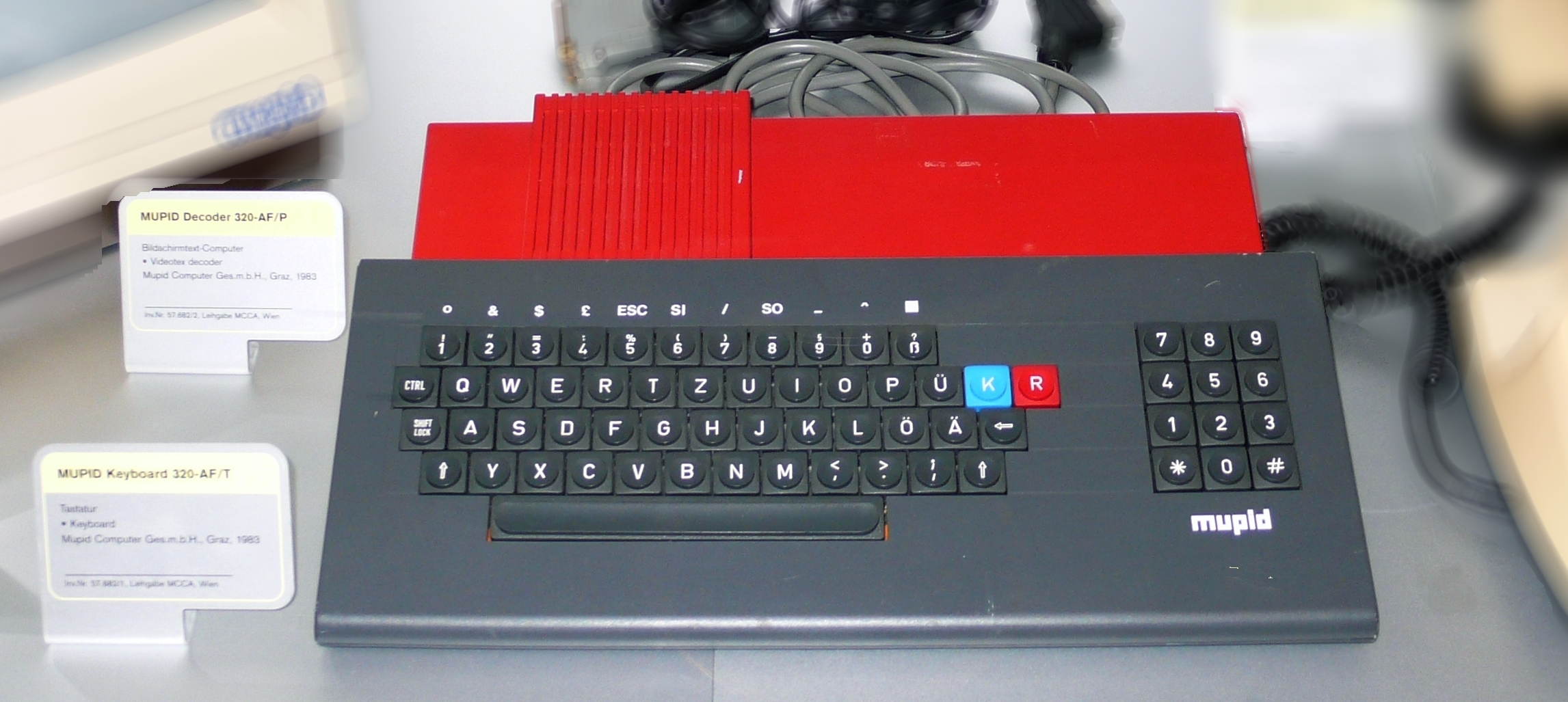
Mupid A320 keyboard and decoder (red)

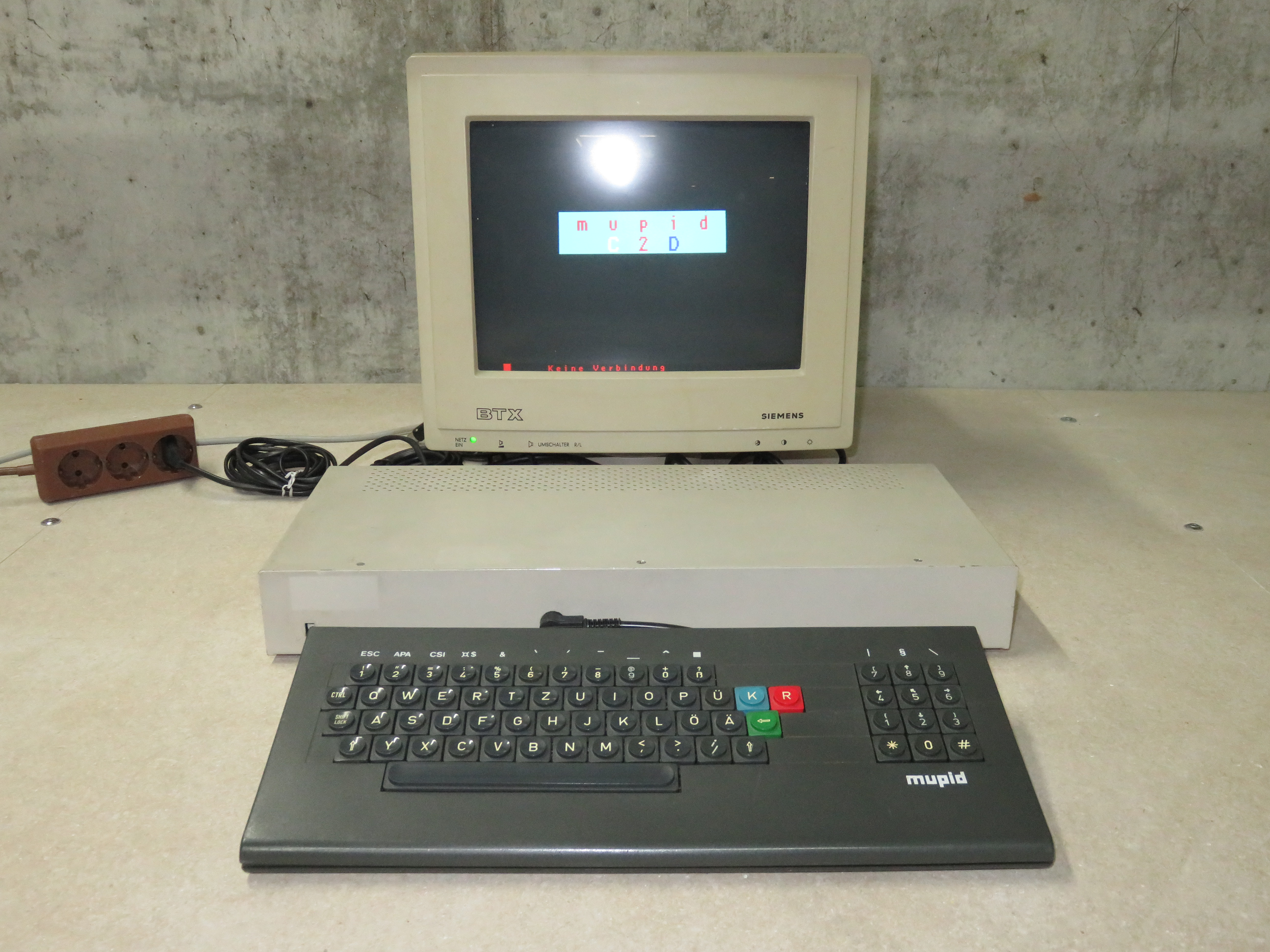
MUPID C2D

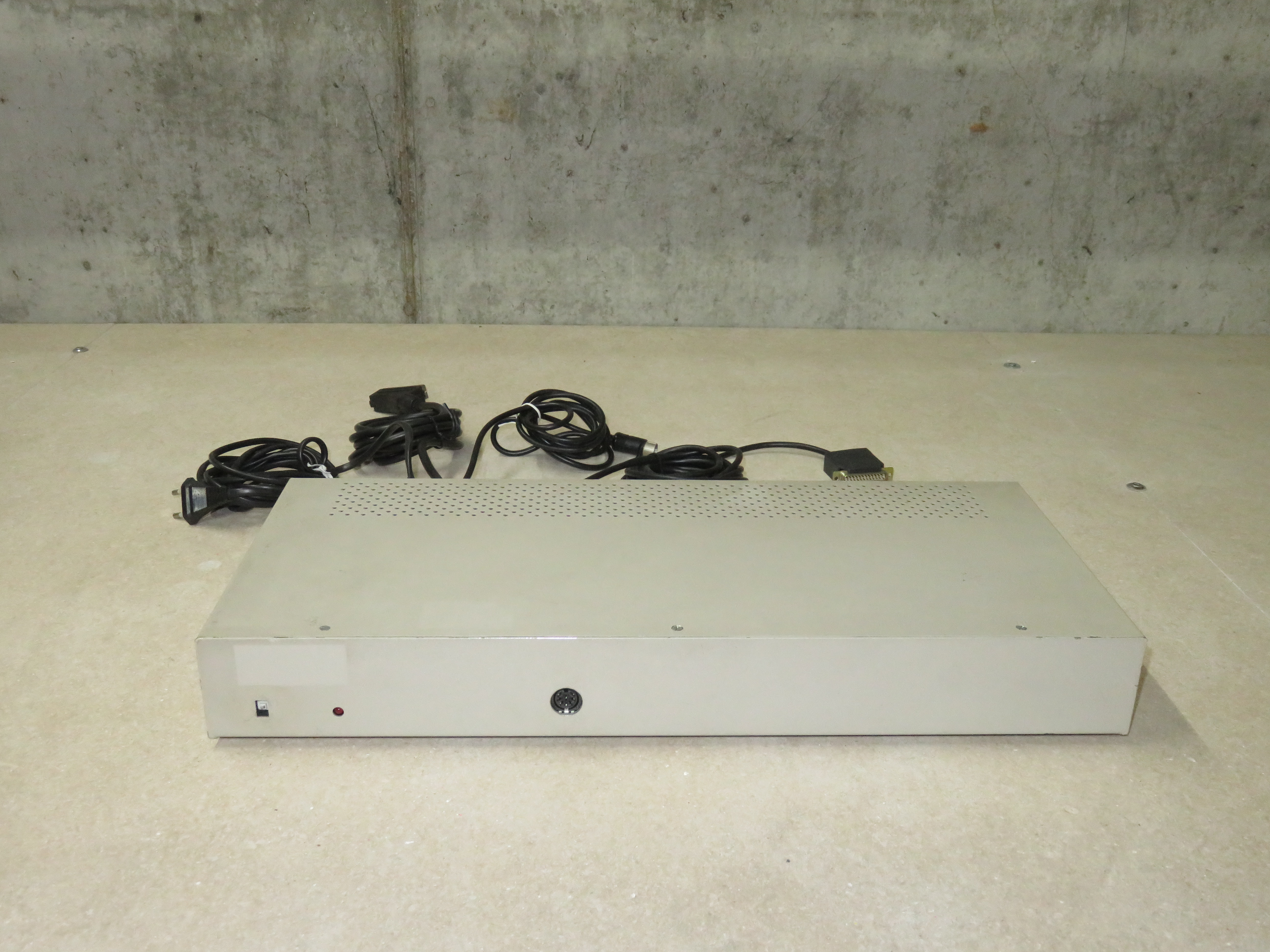
MUPID C2D decoder

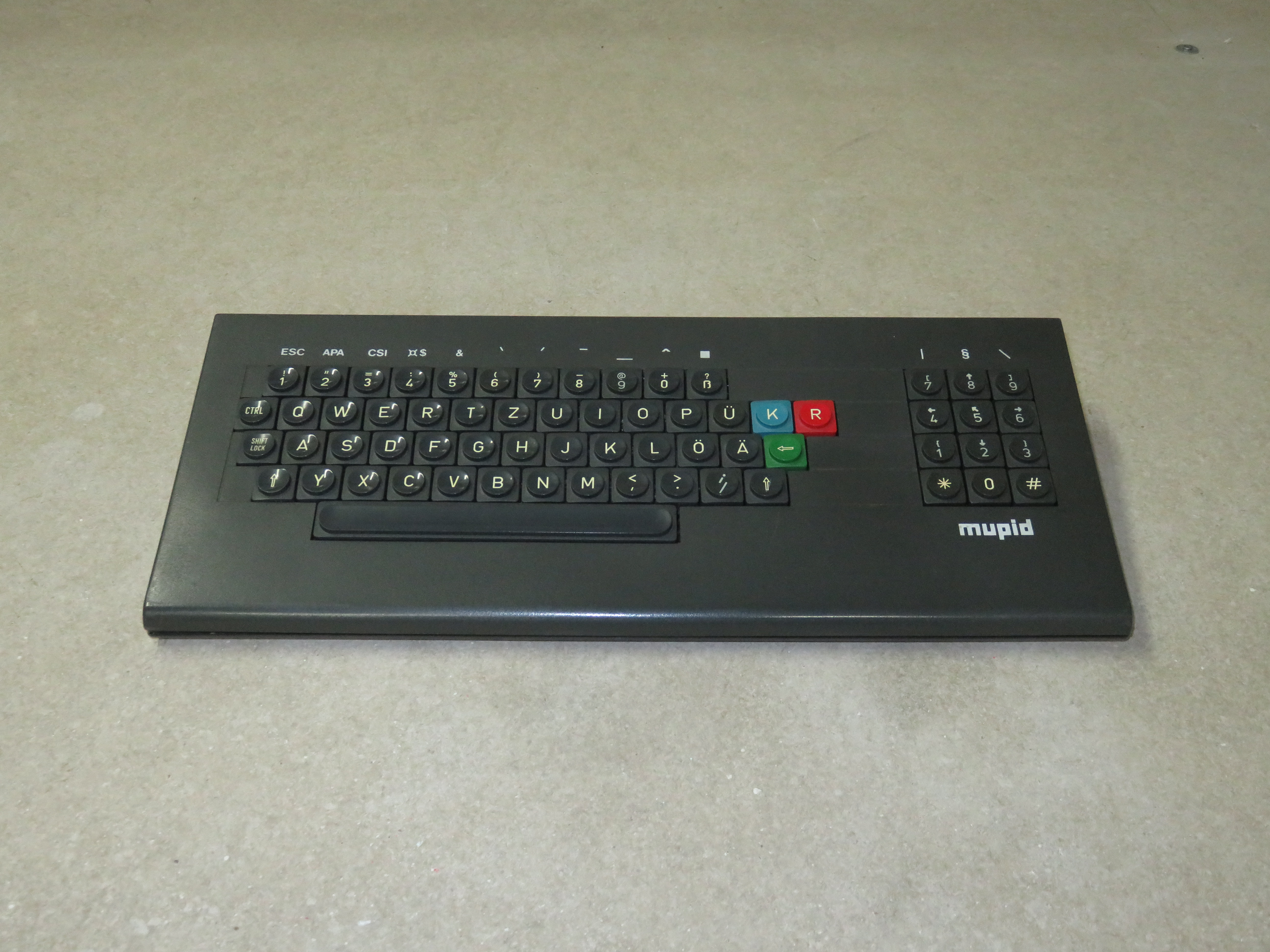
MUPID C2D keyboard

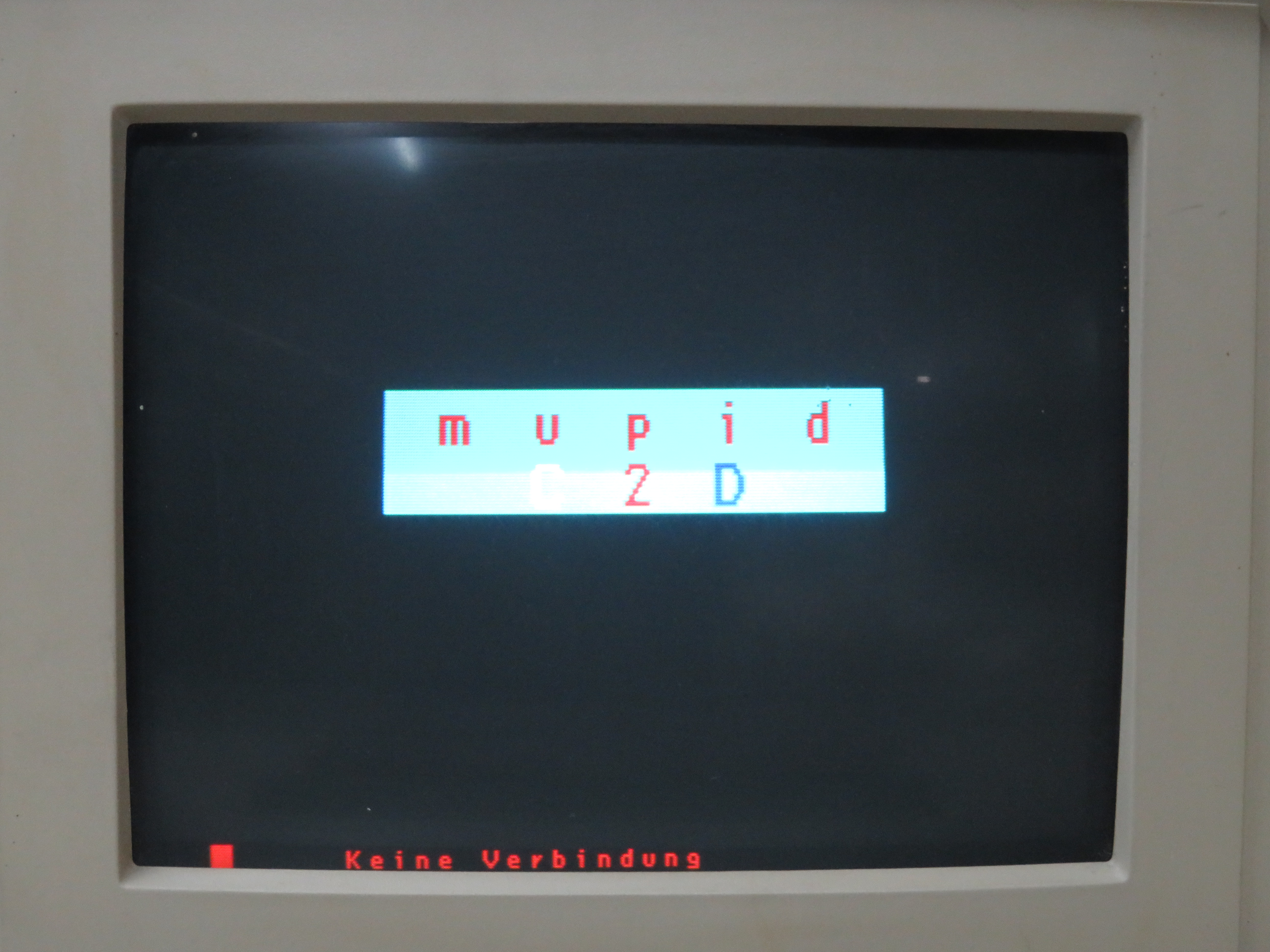
MUPID C2D display

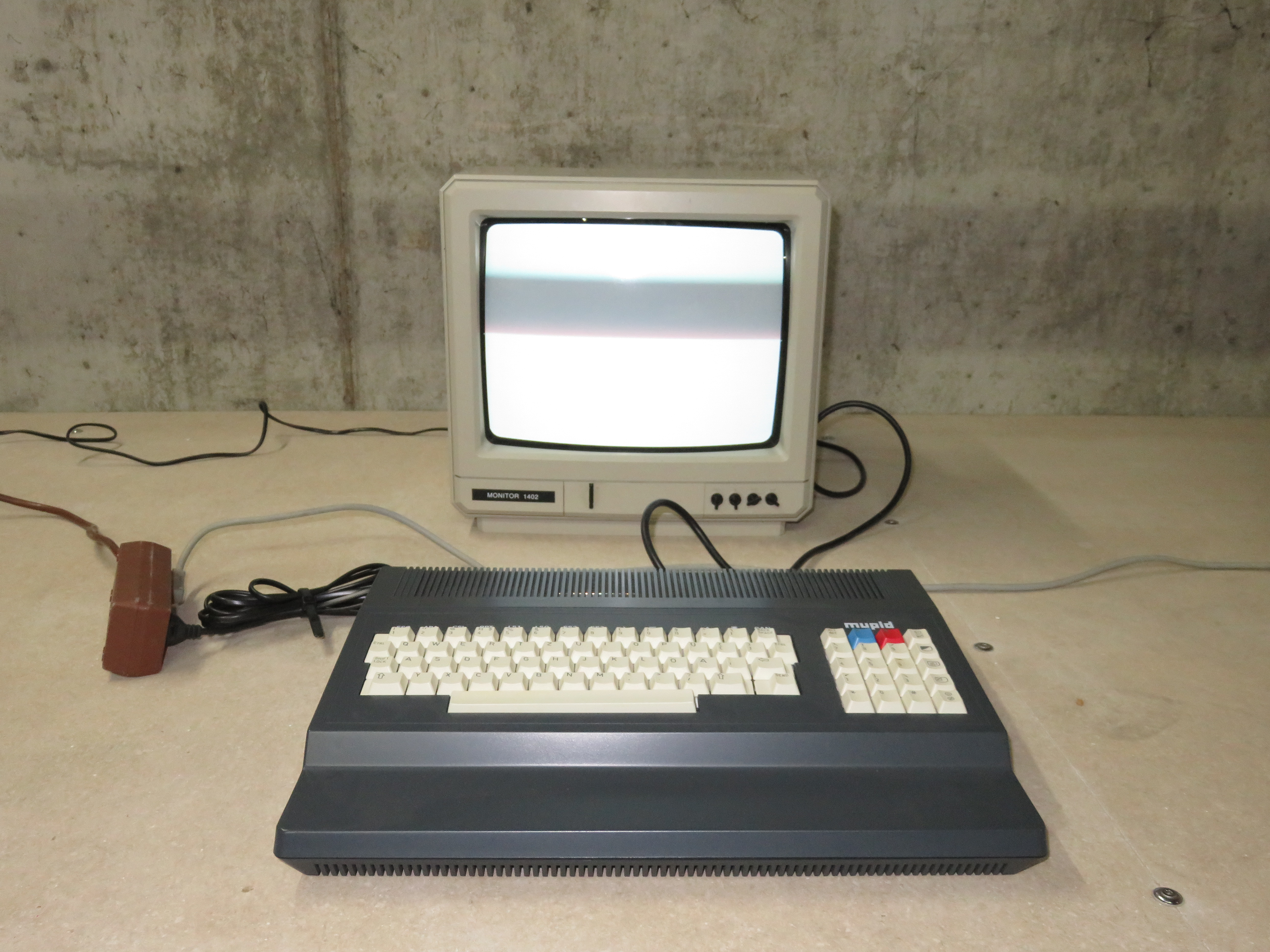
Mupid C2A2

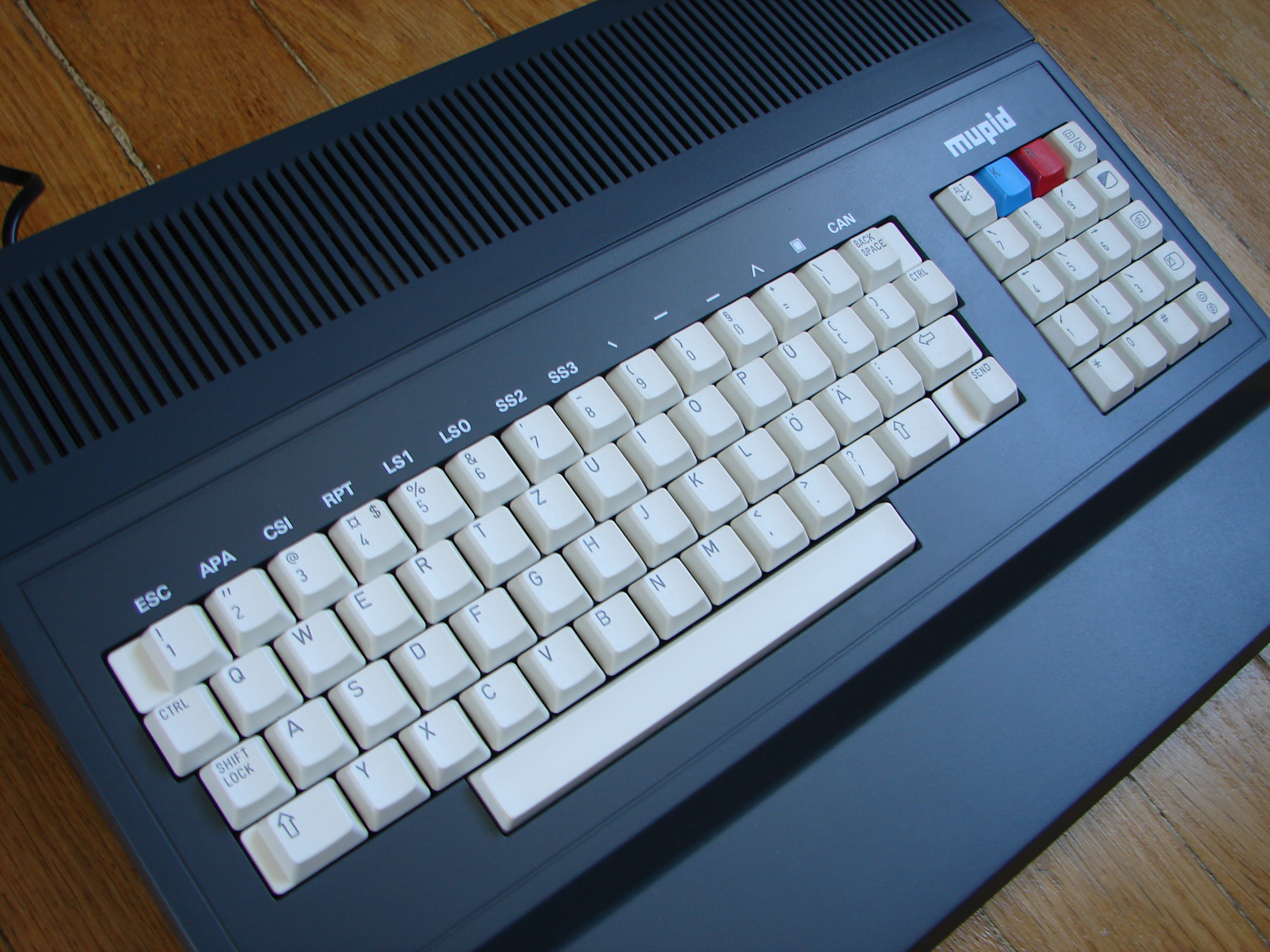
Mupid C2A2 keyboard

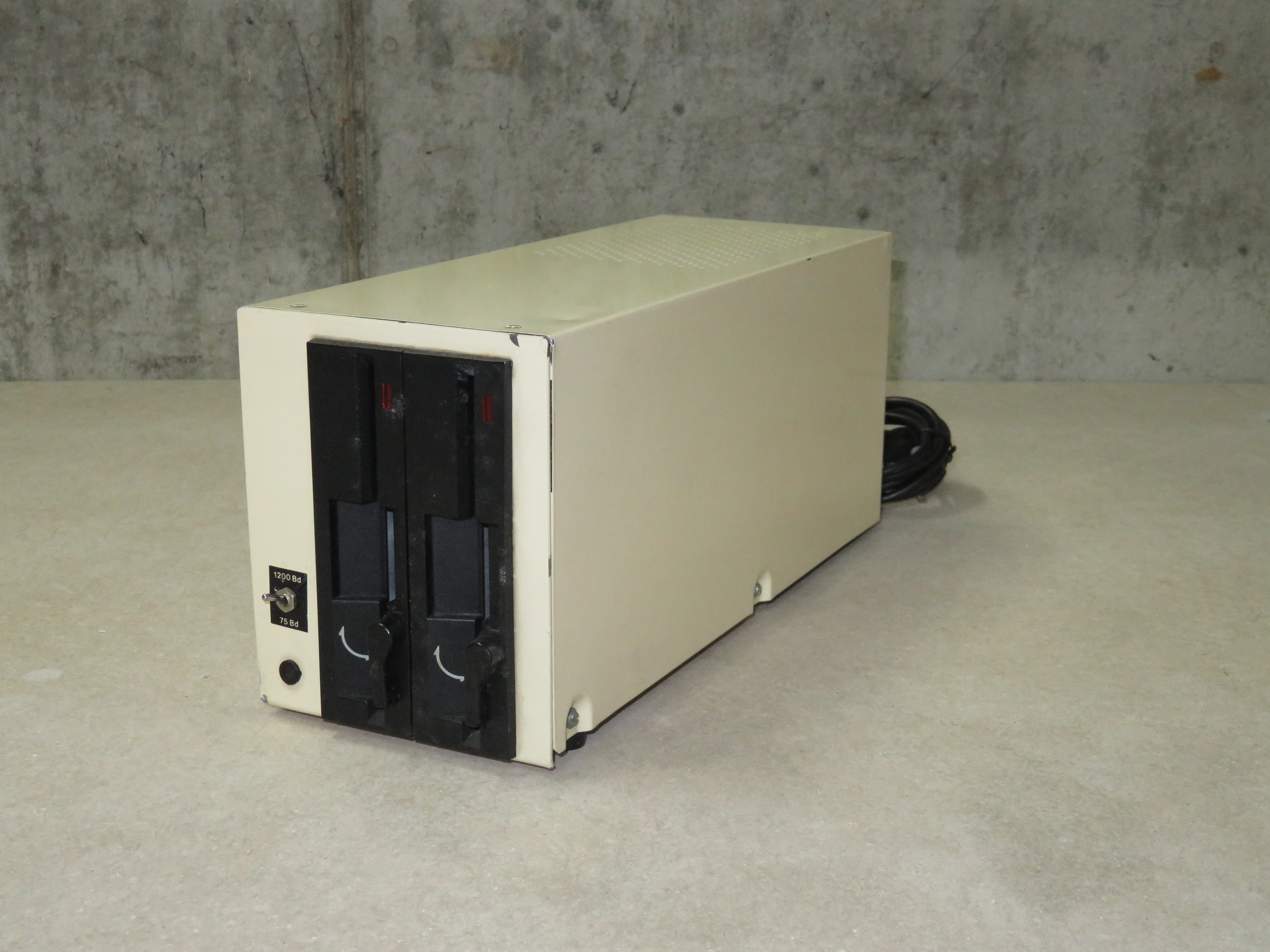
Mupid C2A2 disc drive

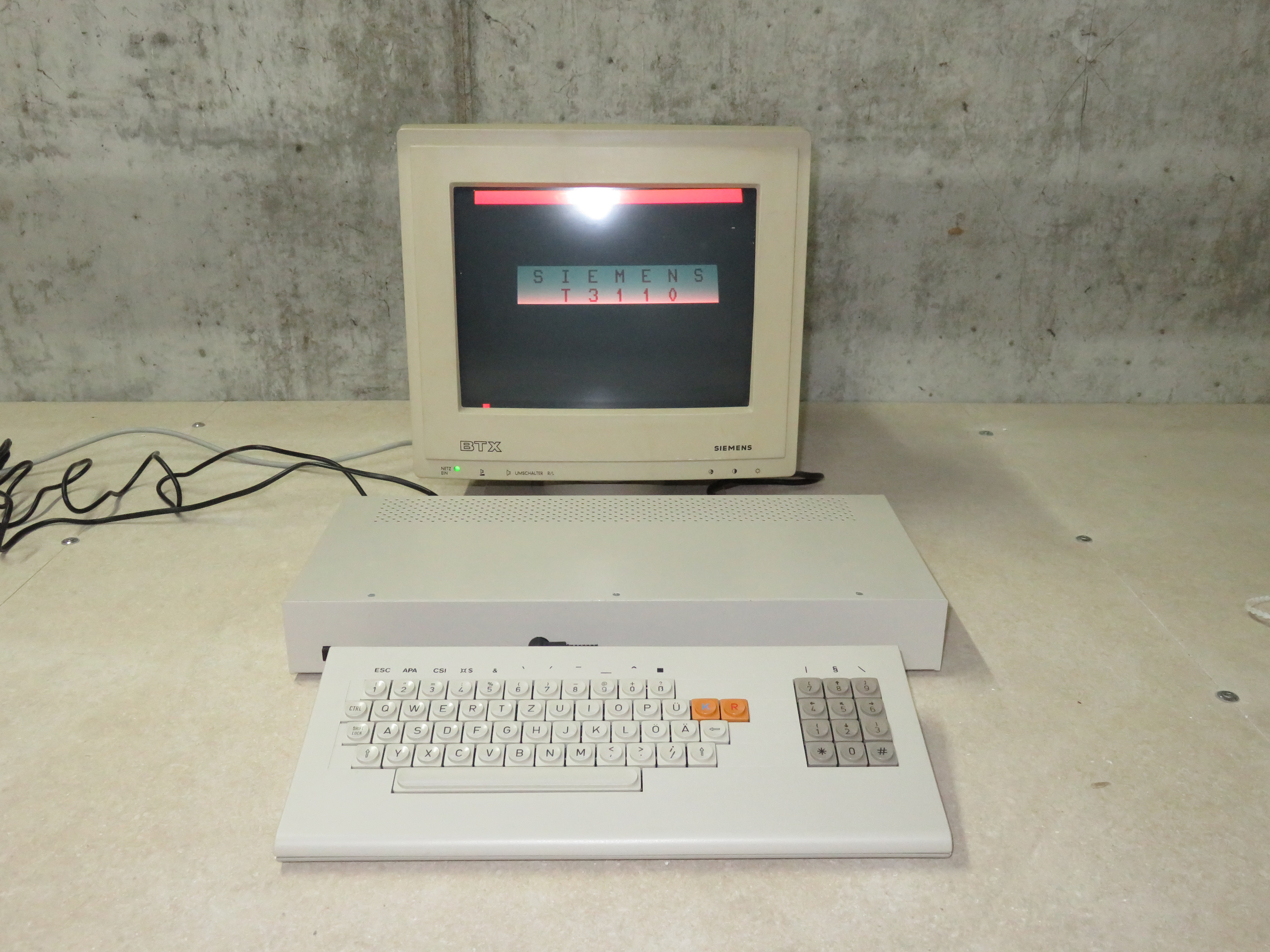
Siemens T3110

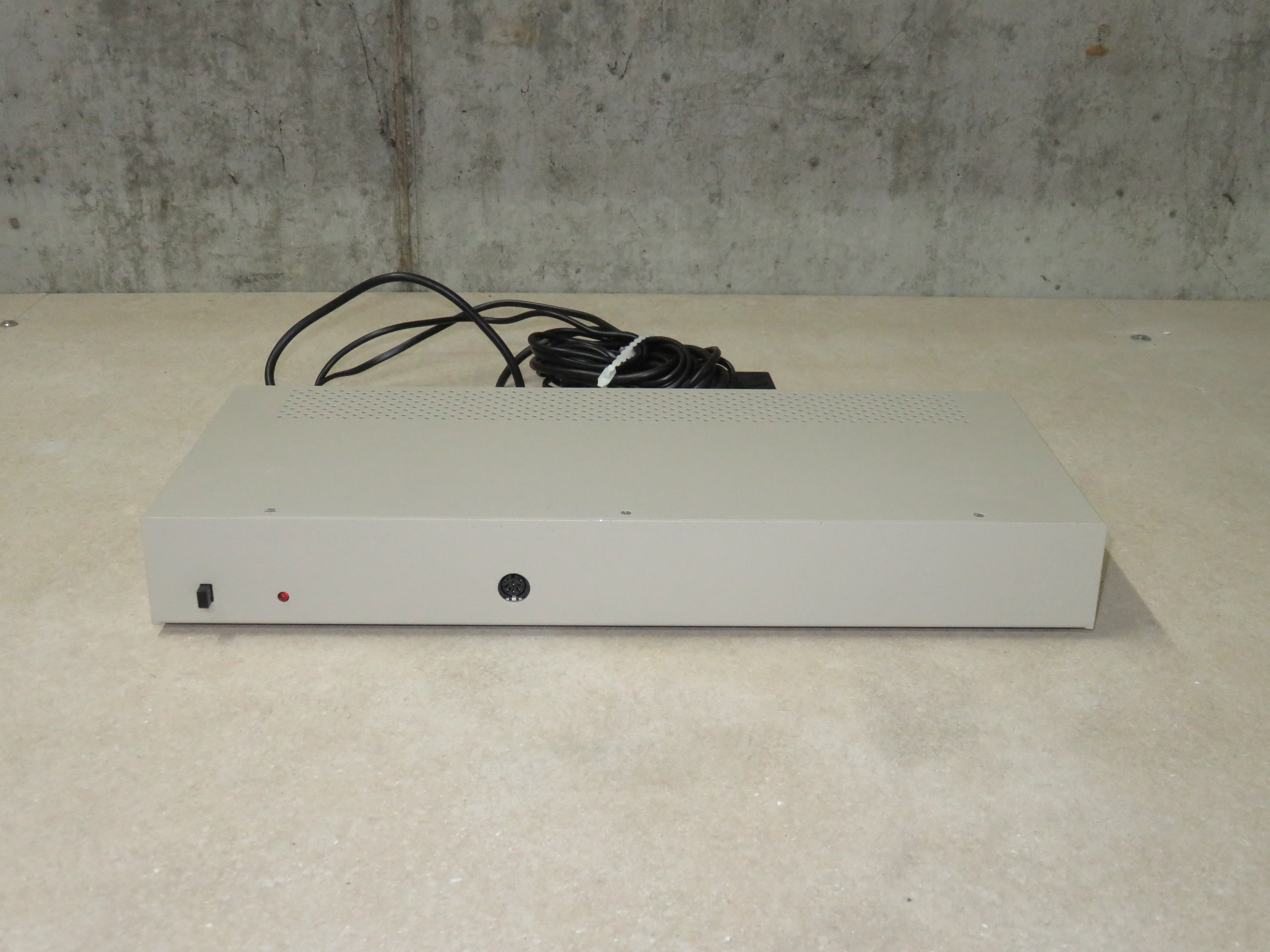
Siemens T3110 decoder

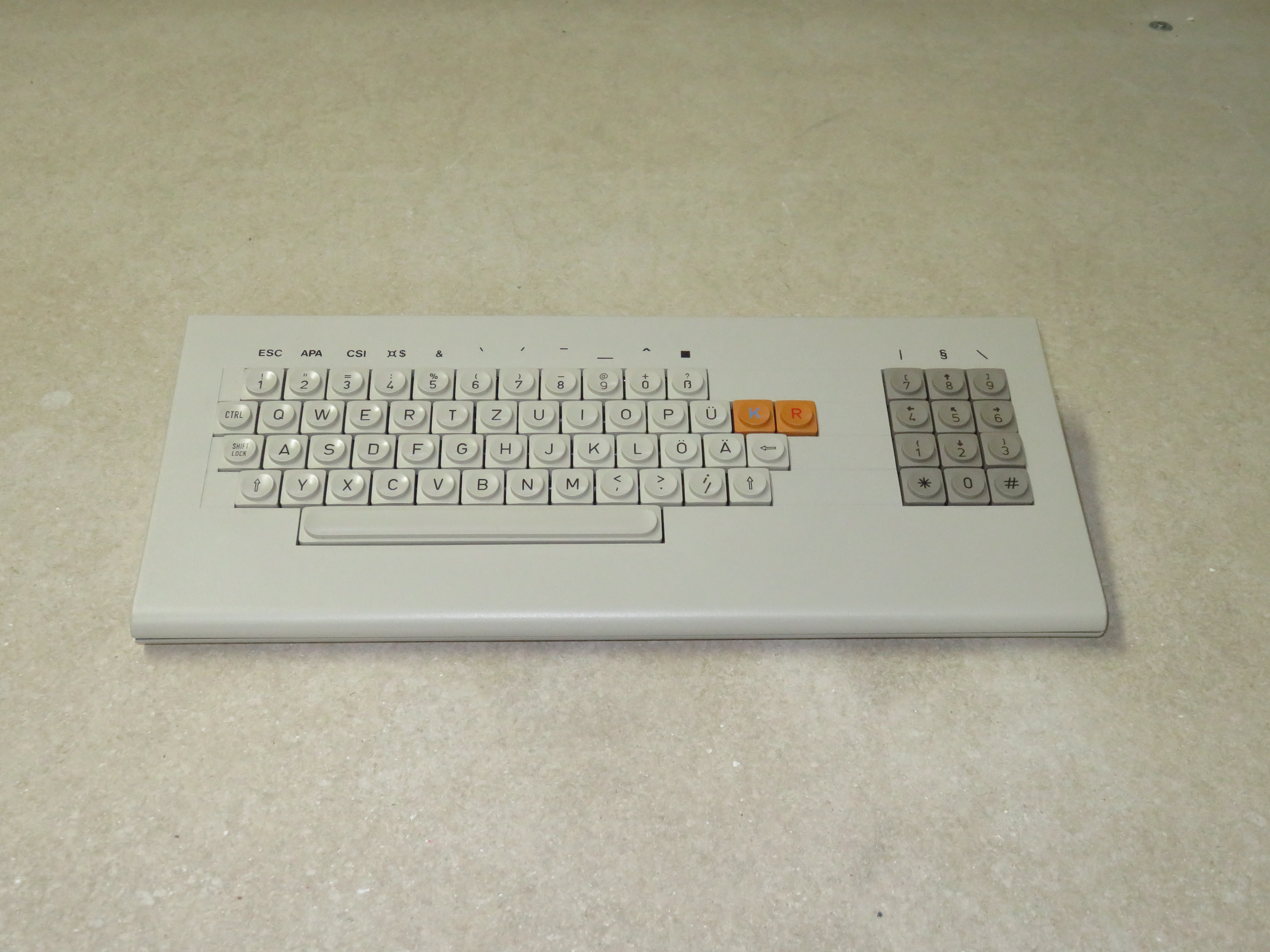
Siemens T3110 keyboard

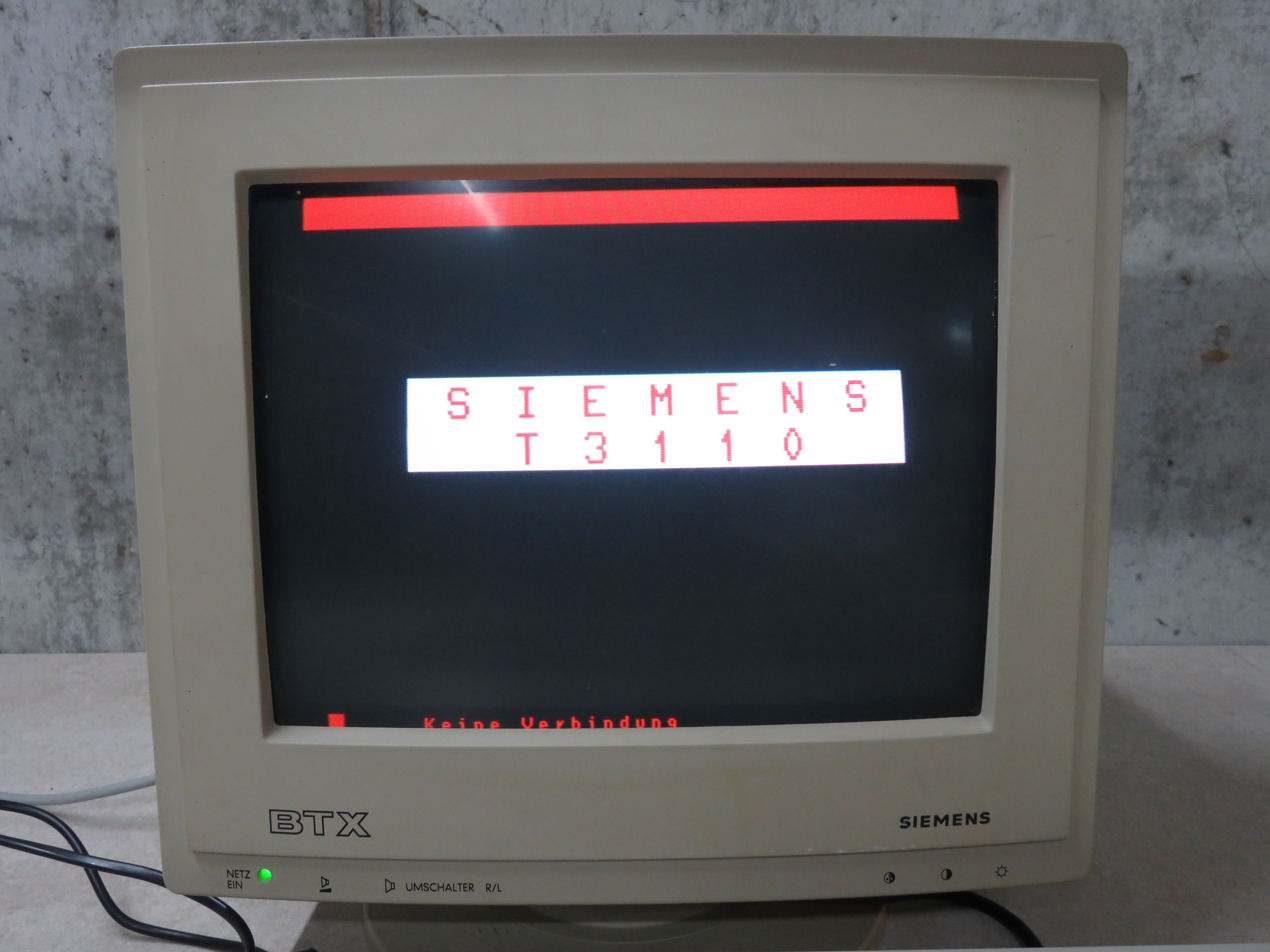
Siemens T3110 display

The original Mupid A320 was followed in 1983 by the MUPID II. This version supported the CEPT Prestel standard, had a better keyboard, a 320 × 240 graphics mode, four voice sound, two DIN6 joystick connectors, a DIN8 tape interface, a DB25 modem, a DE9 serial connector and a DIN8 external disk drive connector.
