= Hermann Maurer =

Austrian computer scientist

Hermann Adolf Maurer
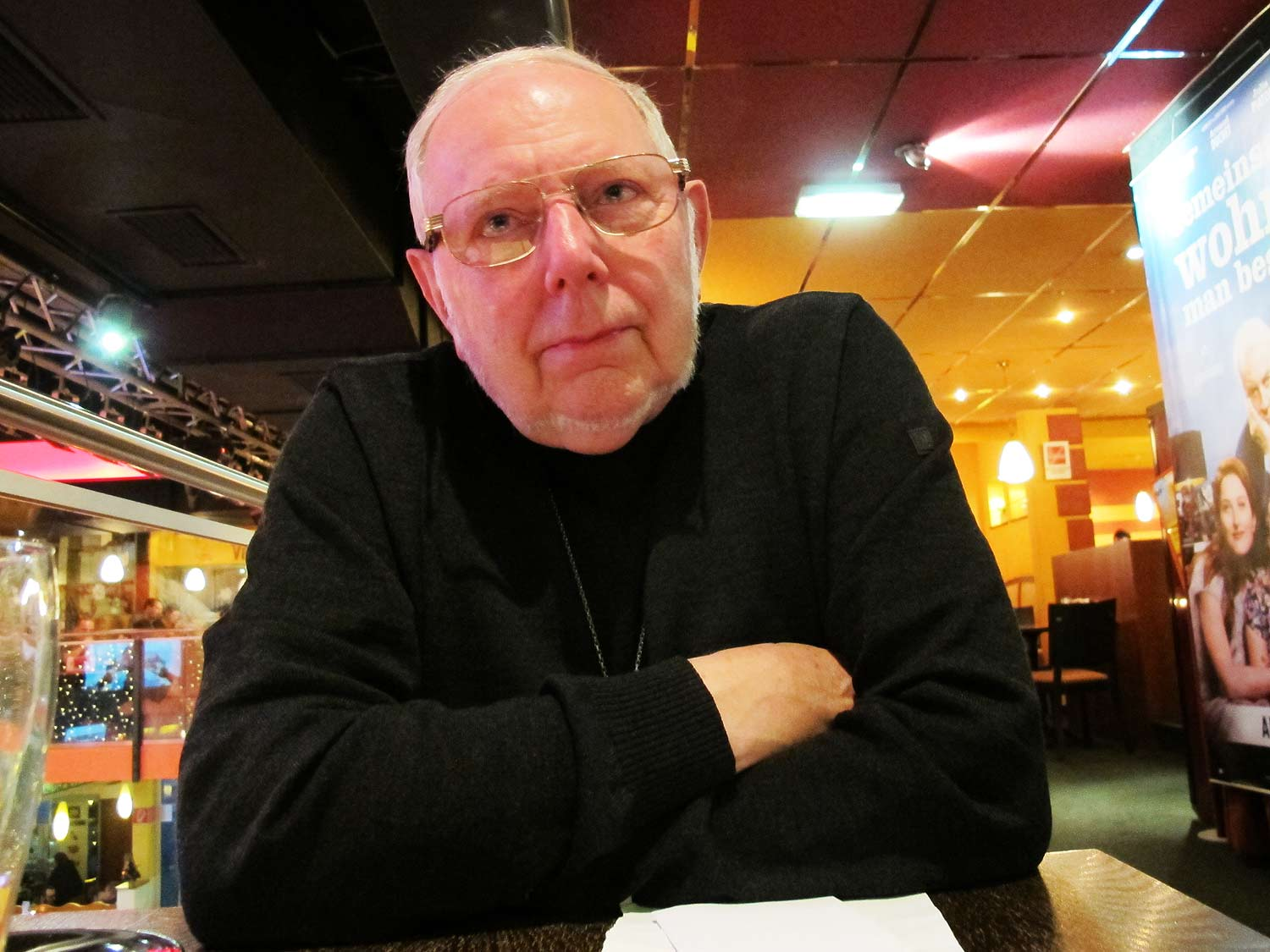
- Born: April 26, 1941 (age 83); Vienna, Nazi Germany
- Education: University of Vienna; University of Calgary
- Scientific career
- Institutions: University of Calgary; University of Karlsruhe; Graz University of Technology
- Doctoral advisor: Edmund Hlawka
- Doctoral students: Hans-Peter Kriegel; Lutz Michael Wegner; Herbert Edelsbrunner; Emo Welzl; Franz Aurenhammer

Hermann Adolf Maurer (born April 26, 1941) is an Austrian computer scientist, serving as Professor of Computer Science at the Graz University of Technology. He has supervised over 40 dissertations, written more than 20 books and over 600 scientific articles, and started or been involved with a number of companies.

== Life ==
Maurer was born in Vienna, Austria. He studied mathematics at the University of Vienna and the University of Calgary (in Canada) starting in 1959. He earned a doctorate in mathematics in 1965 under Edmund Hlawka, with a dissertation entitled Rationale Approximationen Irrationaler Zahlen (Rational Approximations of Irrational Numbers). He was a professor at the University of Calgary from 1966 to 1971, then moved to the University of Karlsruhe from 1971 to 1977, and in 1978 became professor at the Graz University of Technology, where he has remained since.

== Technical contributions ==
Among Maurer's important contributions is the development and promotion of remote interactive data terminals that could display graphics rather than only the text that was conventional at the time, and even exchange programs. He invented the MUPID system, some of whose ideas would be used in the Bildschirmtext system. A number of his students from this research went on to become influential in computer science, the telecommunications industry, and the civil service.

In the 1980s he worked to develop computer network equipment in Styria, and is considered to have helped pave the way for European internet technology. His later research in the area of knowledge management led him to found the company Hyperwave, which he chaired until its bankruptcy in 2005. Since 2006 he heads a new company, NewHyperG.

== Writings on the future ==
In a 2002 - 2012 12-book series, Xperten, Maurer and some collaborators wrote extensively in the context of science fiction on the future of technology. Many of the earlier volumes have been translated into English. Earlier writings appeared under a pseudonym. Maurer thinks that future applications of computers can barely be described using today's terminology, and so employs metaphors such as telepathy and teleportation when discussing some of them.

He is also quite concerned with the risks of information technology, particularly the risk of cyberterrorism due to increasing reliance on interconnected networks. He favors a move away from the Von Neumann architecture's treatment of program code as a type of data, with it instead being put on non-modifiable media such as ROM chips that would be more secure from attacks by viruses.

On non-technical issues, Maurer writes in favor of greater efforts to promote economic equality in managing a transition to a globalized economy, while maintaining local capabilities.

== Decorations and awards ==
- Honorary doctorates from the Universities of St. Petersburg, Calgary and Karlsruhe
- Austrian Cross of Honour for Science and Art, 1st class (2001)
- Great Gold Medal of Honour of Styria
- Member of the Finnish Academy of Sciences
