= Herbert Edelsbrunner =

American computer scientist

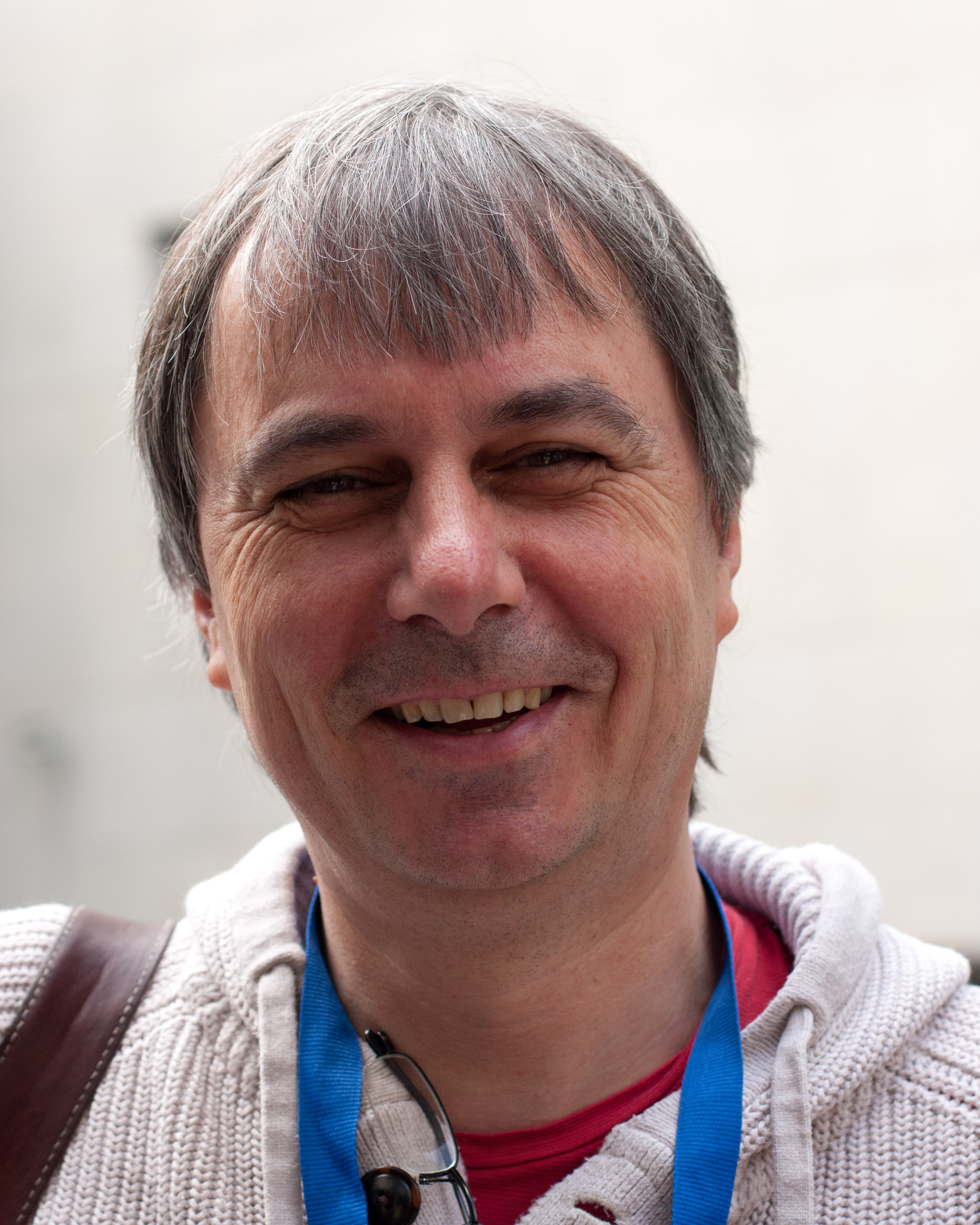
- Herbert Edelsbrunner at SoCG 2011
- Born: March 14, 1958 (age 68); Graz, Austria
- Education: Graz University of Technology
- Spouse: Ping Fu
- Scientific career
- Institutions: University of Illinois at Urbana-Champaign; Duke University; IST Austria
- Doctoral advisor: Hermann Maurer
- Doctoral students: Franz Aurenhammer; Brittany Fasy; Steven Skiena; Yusu Wang

Herbert Edelsbrunner (born March 14, 1958) is a computer scientist working in the field of computational geometry. He is professor at the Institute of Science and Technology Austria (ISTA), and the co-founder of Geomagic, Inc. He was the first of only three computer scientists to win the National Science Foundation's Alan T. Waterman Award.

== Academic biography ==
Edelsbrunner was born in 1958 in Graz, Austria. He received his Diplom in 1980 and Ph.D. in 1982, both from Graz University of Technology. His Ph.D. thesis was entitled Intersection Problems in Computational Geometry obtained under the supervision of Hermann Maurer. After a brief assistant professorship at Graz, he joined the faculty of the University of Illinois at Urbana-Champaign in 1985, and moved to Duke University in 1999. In 1996, with Ping Fu (then director of visualization at the National Center for Supercomputing Applications and his wife), he co-founded Geomagic, a company that develops shape modeling software. Since August 2009 he is professor at the Institute of Science and Technology Austria (ISTA) in Klosterneuburg.

In 1991, Edelsbrunner received the Alan T. Waterman Award. He was elected to the American Academy of Arts and Sciences in 2005, and received an honorary doctorate from Graz University of Technology in 2006. In 2008 he was elected to the German Academy of Sciences Leopoldina. In 2014 he became one of ten inaugural fellows of the European Association for Theoretical Computer Science. He is also a member of the Academia Europaea.

== Publications ==
Edelsbrunner has over 100 research publications and is an ISI highly cited researcher.

He has also published four books on computational geometry: Algorithms in Combinatorial Geometry (Springer-Verlag, 1987, ISBN 978-3-540-13722-1), Geometry and Topology for Mesh Generation (Cambridge University Press, 2001, ISBN 978-0-521-79309-4), Computational Topology (American Mathematical Society, 2009, 978-0821849255) and A Short Course in Computational Geometry and Topology (Springer-Verlag, 2014, ISBN 978-3-319-05956-3).

As Edelsbrunner's Waterman Award citation states,

Dr. Edelsbrunner is a pioneer in the field of computational geometry. ... Dr. Edelsbrunner has had a tremendous impact on computational geometry by his own research as well as by his 1987 book Algorithms in Combinatorial Geometry which systematized the field in its early days. This book is considered by many people to be still the best textbook and reference source on computational geometry.

== Research contributions ==
Edelsbrunner's most heavily cited research contribution is his work with Ernst Mücke on alpha shapes, a technique for defining a sequence of multiscale approximations to the shape of a three-dimensional point cloud. In this technique, one varies a parameter alpha ranging from 0 to the diameter of the point cloud; for each value of the parameter, the shape is approximated as the union of line segments, triangles, and tetrahedra defined by 2, 3, or 4 of the points respectively such that there exists a sphere of radius at most alpha containing only the defining points.

Another heavily cited paper, also with Mücke, concerns “simulation of simplicity.” This is a technique for automatically converting algorithms that work only when their inputs are in general position (for instance, algorithms that may misbehave when some three input points are collinear) into algorithms that work robustly, correctly, and efficiently in the face of special-position inputs.

Edelsbrunner has also made important contributions to algorithms for intersections of line segments, construction of K-sets, the ham sandwich theorem, Delaunay triangulation, point location, interval trees, fractional cascading, and protein docking.
