= Brittany Fasy =

American computer scientist

Brittany Terese Fasy is an American computer scientist and applied mathematician specializing in computational topology, computational geometry, and topological data analysis. She has also worked in computer science education, in a project using storytelling-based programming methods to teach computer science to underserved communities, and collaborated with the student author of a children's book illustrating concepts in topology through interaction with a narwhal. She is an associate professor of in the Gianforte School of Computing at Montana State University, and an affiliate professor in the Montana State Department of Mathematical Sciences.

== Education and career ==
Fasy was an undergraduate at Saint Joseph's University, a Jesuit university in Philadelphia. She graduated summa cum laude with a dual bachelor's degree in mathematics and computer science in 2007, and completed her Ph.D. at Duke University in 2012. Her dissertation, Modes of Gaussian Mixtures and an Inequality for the Distance Between Curves in Space, was supervised by Herbert Edelsbrunner, and included research as a visiting scientist at the Institute of Science and Technology Austria, where Edelsbrunner took a professorship in 2009.

Next, Fasy became a postdoctoral researcher at Carnegie Mellon University from 2012 to 2013 and at Tulane University from 2013 to 2015. She joined Montana State University as an assistant professor and Gianforte Faculty Fellow in 2015, adding an affiliation with the Department of Mathematical Sciences in 2017. She was promoted to associate professor in 2021.

== Recognition ==
Fasy was a 2025 recipient of the Presidential Early Career Award for Scientists and Engineers.
