= Yusu Wang =

Chinese computer scientist and mathematician

Yusu Wang is a Chinese computer scientist and mathematician who works as a professor at the Halıcıoğlu Data Science Institute at the University of California, San Diego. Her research concerns computational geometry and computational topology, including results on discrete Laplace operators, curve simplification, and Fréchet distance.

== Education and career ==
Wang graduated from Tsinghua University in 1998. She completed her Ph.D. in computer science at Duke University in 2004. Her dissertation, Geometric and Topological Methods in Protein Structure Analysis, was jointly supervised by Pankaj K. Agarwal and Herbert Edelsbrunner.

After postdoctoral research with Leonidas J. Guibas at Stanford University, Wang joined the faculty of the Ohio State University in 2005, and she was promoted to the rank of full professor there in 2017. She moved to her current position at the University of California, San Diego in 2020.

== Service ==
Wang is on the editorial boards of the SIAM Journal on Computing and Journal of Computational Geometry. With Gill Barequet, Wang was program co-chair of the 2019 Symposium on Computational Geometry.

== Awards and honors ==
2021: ACM Distinguished Member
