= Ping Fu =

Chinese computer scientist and entrepreneur

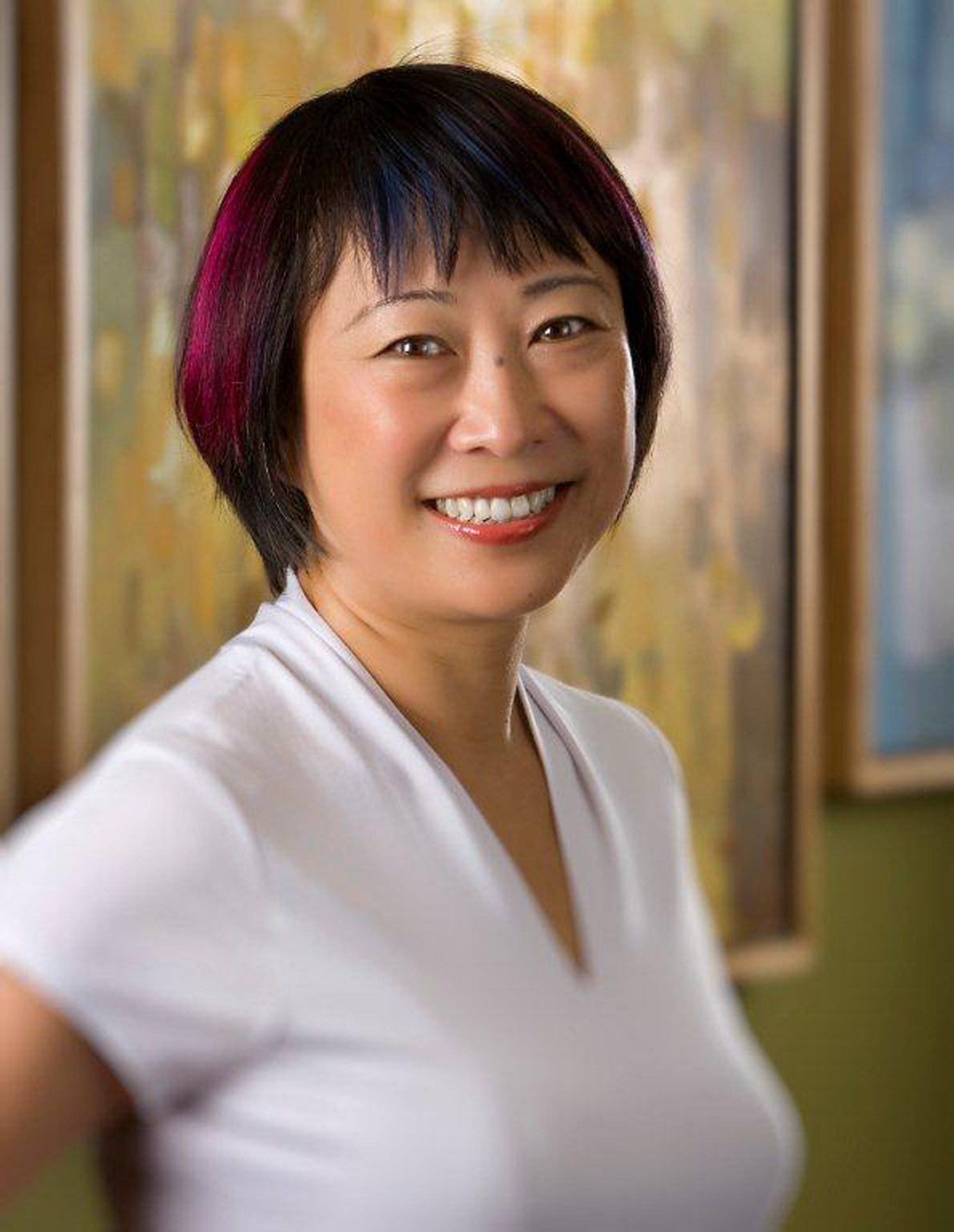
- Born: 1958 (age 67–68); Nanjing, China
- Citizenship: American
- Education: University of California, San Diego; University of Illinois at Urbana-Champaign
- Alma mater: University of California, San Diego
- Occupations: Vice President and Chief Entrepreneur Officer, 3D Systems
- Employer: 3D Systems
- Notable work: Bend, Not Break: A Life In Two Worlds
- Board member of: Long Now Foundation; National Advisory Council for Innovation and Entrepreneurship; Live Nation Entertainment

Ping Fu
- Chinese: 傅苹
Transcriptions
Standard Mandarin
- Hanyu Pinyin: Fù Píng

Ping Fu (born 1958) is a Chinese-American entrepreneur. She is the co-founder of 3D software development company Geomagic, and was its chief executive officer until February 2013 when the company was acquired by 3D Systems Inc. As of March 2014, she is the Vice President and Chief Entrepreneur Officer at 3D Systems. Fu grew up in China during the Cultural Revolution and moved to the United States in 1984. She co-founded Geomagic in 1997 with her then-husband Herbert Edelsbrunner, and has been recognized for her achievements with the company through a number of awards, including being named Inc. magazine's 2005 "Entrepreneur of the Year". In 2013, she published her memoir, Bend, Not Break, co-authored with MeiMei Fox.

== Early life and education ==
Ping Fu was born in 1958 in Nanjing, China, where her father was a professor at the Nanjing University of Aeronautics and Astronautics (NUAA). Fu spent her childhood and early adulthood in China. She grew up during the Cultural Revolution, during which she was separated from both her parents for several years. After the end of the Cultural Revolution, she attended the college that later became the Suzhou University studying Chinese literature. Fu has related in interviews and in her memoir that she chose to research China's one-child policy for her thesis and traveled to the countryside, where she found that infanticide of female infants was common, as was abortion, even late into pregnancy. Fu said that, after turning in her research, she believes it was passed to a newspaper editor who wrote an editorial on the infanticide of female children. Fu has stated that she was later briefly imprisoned by government officials and was told to leave the country. After this event, she left school, without graduating.

Fu left China and arrived in the United States in January 1984. She initially enrolled at the University of New Mexico (UNM) in Albuquerque but later moved to San Diego to study computer science as an undergraduate at the University of California, San Diego. During her time in San Diego, Fu worked part-time at a software company called Resource Systems Group as a programmer and database software consultant. Following her graduation from UC San Diego with a bachelor's degree in computer science, she moved to Illinois, where she took a job with Bell Labs. The company offered a Ph.D assistance program, through which Fu enrolled in the computer science Ph.D program at the University of Illinois at Urbana-Champaign (UIUC). At UIUC she completed a master's degree in computer science.

== Career ==
=== National Center for Supercomputing Applications ===
In the early 1990s, Fu began working at the National Center for Supercomputing Applications (NCSA) at UIUC. Her focus was on computer graphics and visualization, including projects such as developing the morphing software for animation of the liquid metal T-1000 robot in the film Terminator 2: Judgment Day. While at NCSA, she hired student researcher Marc Andreessen and was his supervisor on the project developing NCSA's Mosaic, an early multimedia web browser credited with popularizing the World Wide Web. According to her supervisor, Joseph Hardin, Fu was one of the managers involved in the discussions from which the idea for the browser was developed. In 1994 Ping took a temporary position at the Hong Kong University of Science and Technology, returning to NCSA in 1995.

=== Geomagic ===
In 1996, Marc Andreessen's success with his own company, Netscape, inspired UIUC to encourage entrepreneurship and Fu developed the idea for a company that would combine manufacturing and digital technology, including 3D modeling software, the concept of which she called the "Personal Factory". She founded Geomagic with her then-husband, Herbert Edelsbrunner, whose research formed the basis for the initial software to be developed by the company. In 1997, she left the NCSA to begin operations at Geomagic, taking on the role of CEO. The company was originally named Raindrop Geomagic and was based in Champaign-Urbana, Illinois. It was founded with the aim of developing 3D imaging software that could enable customized manufacturing using 3D printers. Initially, Fu and Edelsbrunner funded Geomagic themselves, along with investment from Fu's sister Hong and her husband, and later from a group of angel investors.

In 1999, Fu relocated Geomagic from Illinois to the Research Triangle Park, North Carolina. That year, Franklin Street Partners committed to invest $6.5 million in Geomagic. Fu then hired an experienced executive as CEO who ran Geomagic for two years before stepping down when the company was close to bankruptcy. Fu returned to the role of CEO in 2001, investing her own money into Geomagic and working without a salary in order to continue paying the company's employees. She was able to lead Geomagic back to stability, gaining a significant contract with Align Technology, and Geomagic returned to profitability over the following two years.

From 2001 to 2003, Geomagic's sales tripled under Fu's leadership. The company became known as a leader in digital shape sampling and processing. After she and Edelsbrunner divorced, he continued to serve as an advisor at Geomagic.

In February 2013, Fu sold Geomagic to 3D Systems Corporation, a 3D printing company. She became the Chief Strategy Officer and Vice-President of 3D Systems.

=== Other roles ===
In addition to leading Geomagic, Fu has held a number of advisory roles relating to technology and entrepreneurship and with charitable organizations. She has served on the U.S. National Advisory Council on Innovation and Entrepreneurship since 2010 and is also a member of the National Council on Women in Technology. In 2012, she was appointed to the board of the Long Now Foundation, a non-profit organization focused on long-term thinking and enduring technology. She also serves on the board of the Frank Hawkins Kenan Institute of Private Enterprise at the University of North Carolina, the board of Live Nation Entertainment and is an advisor at Modern Meadow, an organization focused on tissue engineering. Since 2017, Ping has served on the Board of Directors of the Burning Man Project; she first attended Burning Man in 2010, and she gave Burning Man a donation to support the purchase of Fly Ranch.

== Memoir ==
On December 31, 2012, Fu published a memoir, Bend, Not Break: A Life in Two Worlds. Co-authored with MeiMei Fox, the book told the stories of her life, from her early childhood in China to her experiences as an entrepreneur, including founding and leading Geomagic. The book received positive reviews from outlets including The Wall Street Journal and Oprah.com.

Beginning in January 2013, commenters in the Amazon.com reviews for the memoir began posting critical reviews, accusing Fu of lying about events in her past. Around the same time, first in English, then in Chinese on Forbes China, Forbes published an interview with Fu that discussed Fu's memoir and her early life, which contained an inaccurate interpretation of where Ping Fu lived during the cultural revolution. Chinese netizens responded to the piece with criticisms regarding alleged fabrication of events and inconsistencies in media coverage of Fu, which raised questions in the media about the veracity of details included in the memoir. Chinese blogger Fang Zhouzi was among the critics and he later raised further questions and criticisms based on earlier media coverage of Fu. Following the initial criticisms from Fang Zhouzi and other critics, commenters appearing to be non-native English speakers knowledgeable about Chinese history posted hundreds of negative comments in the memoir's Amazon.com reviews, leading The Daily Beast and New York Times to conclude that Ping was the subject of an online attack.

Fu responded to the criticisms through a public statement, and a post on the Huffington Post website answering questions that were raised about her childhood, education and being forced to leave China. She acknowledged that there were some inaccuracies in the book. She also acknowledged that the Red Guard atrocity she related in the memoir and media interviews regarding a teacher being pulled apart by four horses may have been an emotional memory, the result of hearing tales of such barbarity in old China as a child and having nightmares about it, or seeing it in a movie, rather than actually seeing it. In response to questions about accuracy of details in the book, her publisher stated that the book is a memoir, rather than a journalistic account of the Cultural Revolution. Fu has said that a second print of the memoir will correct inaccuracies that have been pointed out.

== Awards and recognitions ==
For her work with Geomagic, Fu has received a number of awards. In 2003 she was named the Ernst & Young "Entrepreneur of the Year" for the Carolinas and received the Entrepreneurial Inspiration Award from North Carolina's Council for Entrepreneurial Development. The following year, Fast Company named her a 2004 "Fast 50" winner. In 2005, Inc. magazine named Ping its "Entrepreneur of the Year".

The America China Business Women’s Alliance awarded Fu its "Business Innovation Award" in 2008 and she received the 2010 "Leadership Award" from the CAD Society. The next year, she was given a "Lifetime Achievement" award by the Triangle Business Journal. In 2011 she was given the William C. Friday Award at North Carolina State University, and in 2012, the United States Citizenship and Immigration Services named Fu as an "Outstanding American by Choice".

== Bibliography ==
- Fu, Ping; Fox, MeiMei (2012). Bend, Not Break: A Life in Two Worlds. Portfolio Hardcover. p. 288. ISBN 978-1591845522.
