= MSN China =

Chinese Internet portal

- Website type: Web portal
- Area served: China
- Owners: Joint venture Microsoft (50%)
- Website: cn.msn.com at the Wayback Machine (archived June 2, 2016)
- Current status: Discontinued

MSN China was a joint venture of the global software corporation Microsoft, part of its MSN service, located in the People's Republic of China. Unlike most other international versions of the MSN portal, which have used the same layout as the United States since 2014, MSN China utilized a unique design and had a separate editorial division.

In 2010 MSN China announced a partnership with Sina to integrate each other's services as a reaction towards one of mainland China's largest internet companies, Tencent.

In 2016 Microsoft announced that they would discontinue the MSN China website on June 7 in favor of Windows 10 services and would redirect their portal to a number of Chinese websites and their search engine, Bing. In 2018 the website was relaunced.

== MSN Juku ==
In November 2009, MSN China launched an Internet application called MSN Juku in beta. Commentators described it as a "Twitter-style" microblogging service, although MSN China rejects that description. From the beginning, observers noted similarity between the MSN Juku user interface and that of established microblogging service Plurk, which was blocked in China in April 2009.

On December 14, 2009, the official Plurk blog posted an accusation that MSN China plagiarized about 80% of Plurk's original code, as well as elements of their CSS and unique user interface features. Microsoft stated in a press release that it looked into the accusations. The next day, Microsoft confirmed that MSN Juku (which, it stated, had been developed by a Chinese contractor) did contain copied code, and stated that the service would be indefinitely suspended.

== Mobile apps ==
Microsoft lists their Chinese MSN apps for the Windows Phone platform under Microsoft Online (alternatively known as MSN China in Google Play and Shanghai MSN Network Communications Technology Company Limited in iTunes) lists several applications that are and aren't MSN branded such as the Bing Dictionary (必應詞典), Bing Reader (必讀), Star-Bing (追星必應), Bing Images (必應圖片), Bing Maps (必應地圖), Bing Mind-Reading Robot (必應問答), Chinese MSN, msnNOW, Windows Live Messenger, Xiaoice (微軟小冰) and several others in the Windows Phone Store and on other platforms.
