= DSSP (imaging) =

DSSP stands for digital shape sampling and processing. It is an alternative and often preferred way of describing "reverse engineering" software and hardware. The term originated in a 2005 Society of Manufacturing Engineers' "Blue Book" on the topic, which referenced numerous suppliers of both scanning hardware and processing software.

DSSP employs various 3D scanning methods, including laser scanners, to acquire thousands to millions of points on the surface of a form and then software from a variety of suppliers to convert the resulting "point cloud" into forms useful for inspection, computer-aided design, visualization and other applications. It may also employ volumetric methods of scanning, such as digital tomography.

Some common applications include CAI (computer-aided inspection), creation of 3D CAD models from scanned data, medical applications, 3D imaging for Web 2.0 applications, and the restoration of culturally significant artifacts; as well as conventional reverse engineering for creating replacement parts.

The term 'reverse engineering' itself has acquired some notoriety when the technology has been used to copy others' designs.

The term 'laser scanning' has also been used somewhat interchangeably for DSSP. However, there are two problems with the term as a broad description of the field. First, it is only one of many alternative scanning technologies. Second, it misses the essential role of processing software in converting point cloud data into useful forms.

In some ways, DSSP is a 3D analog to DSP (digital signal processing) in that the software attempts to extract a clear and accurate 3D image from point data that may include noise. The notion of 'shape sampling' embedded in the term also acknowledges that, as in many measurement processes, the accuracy of the 3D data will depend upon the number and accuracy of points sampled.

The speed and accuracy of both scanners to acquire data and software algorithms to extract useful data has dramatically increased in recent years. The amount of data capturing capability has also increased many fold, due to the advances in the camera technology and faster, more powerful computers. As some the limitations of the technology are eliminated and costs reduced, more uses are appearing.
