= Geomagic =

3D engineering and graphics software

Geomagic is the professional engineering software brand of Hexagon AB. The products are focused on computer-aided design, with an emphasis on 3D scanning and other non-traditional design methodologies, such as voxel-based modeling with haptic input.

== History ==
Raindrop Geomagic was founded in 1996 by Ping Fu and Herbert Edelsbrunner in Champaign, Illinois. The name was later shortened to Geomagic. It was acquired by 3D Systems in February 2013 and combined with that company's other software businesses (namely Rapidform acquired by 3D Systems in October 2012 and Albre in July 2011). Geomagic had previously acquired SensAble technologies. On 12 December 2024, it was acquired by Hexagon AB. It will be part of their Manufacturing Intelligence Division.

== Products ==
Geomagic Capture is an integrated system consisting of a blue LED structured-light 3D scanner and one of several pieces of application-specific software. The systems are marketed for use as scan-based design tools, wherein a physical object is 3D scanned and then converted into a 3D CAD model, or inspection tools, wherein a physical object is scanned and then dimensionally verified by comparing to a nominal 3D CAD model.

Geomagic Design is a mechanical Computer-Aided Design software, with an emphasis on the design of mechanical systems and assemblies. Geomagic Freeform and Sculpt software are voxel-based modeling software packages, and are bundled with 3D Systems' Touch haptic devices which interface with the software to deliver force-feedback to the user. Geomagic Design X, Design Direct, Studio and Wrap are software products that offer different workflows for creating manufacturing-ready 3D models, including Solid modeling and NURBS surfacing.

Geomagic Qualify and Geomagic Verify focus on delivering measurement, comparison and reporting software tools for first-article and automated inspection processes. Data from point cloud and 3D scanners and Coordinate Measuring Machines (CMMs) can be used, as well as CAD data imported into the system.
