= 2010s in video games =

Video game-related events in 2010s

- 2000s
- 2010s in video games
- 2020s
Other topics in 2010s:
- Anthropology
- Comics
- Fashion
- Motorsport
- Music
- Science and technology
- Sociology
- Television

The 2010s was the fifth decade in the industry's history. The decade was notable for producing the first truly "3D" games and consoles by introducing virtual reality to consumers, cloud gaming, and the rising influence of tablet-based and mobile casual games, including a boom in freemium titles. The industry remained heavily dominated by the actions of Nintendo, Sony, and Microsoft. The eighth generation of video game consoles was released, including the Wii U, PlayStation 4, Xbox One, Nintendo Switch, Nintendo 3DS, and PlayStation Vita. Notable games released in the decade included Minecraft, Fortnite, PUBG: Battlegrounds, Grand Theft Auto V, The Elder Scrolls V: Skyrim, The Last of Us, The Legend of Zelda: Breath of the Wild, The Witcher 3: Wild Hunt, Uncharted 4: A Thief's End, Red Dead Redemption, Marvel's Spider-Man, Dark Souls, Super Smash Bros. Ultimate, Batman: Arkham City, BioShock Infinite, Dishonored, Halo: Reach, Mass Effect 2, Disco Elysium, Undertale, Overwatch, Super Mario Odyssey, Red Dead Redemption 2, L.A. Noire, Bloodborne, Sekiro: Shadows Die Twice, Far Cry 3, Destiny, StarCraft II: Wings of Liberty, The Walking Dead, Persona 5, Dragon Age: Inquisition, Portal 2, Diablo III, Horizon Zero Dawn, Journey, Shovel Knight, Apex Legends, Metal Gear Solid V: The Phantom Pain, XCOM: Enemy Unknown, Super Mario Galaxy 2, Wolfenstein: The New Order, Death Stranding, Titanfall 2, Xenoblade Chronicles, Xenoblade Chronicles 2, Cuphead, Terraria, Alien: Isolation, Fallout 4, God of War, Borderlands 2, and Hollow Knight.

== Consoles of the 2010s ==
=== Seventh generation consoles (2005–2017) ===
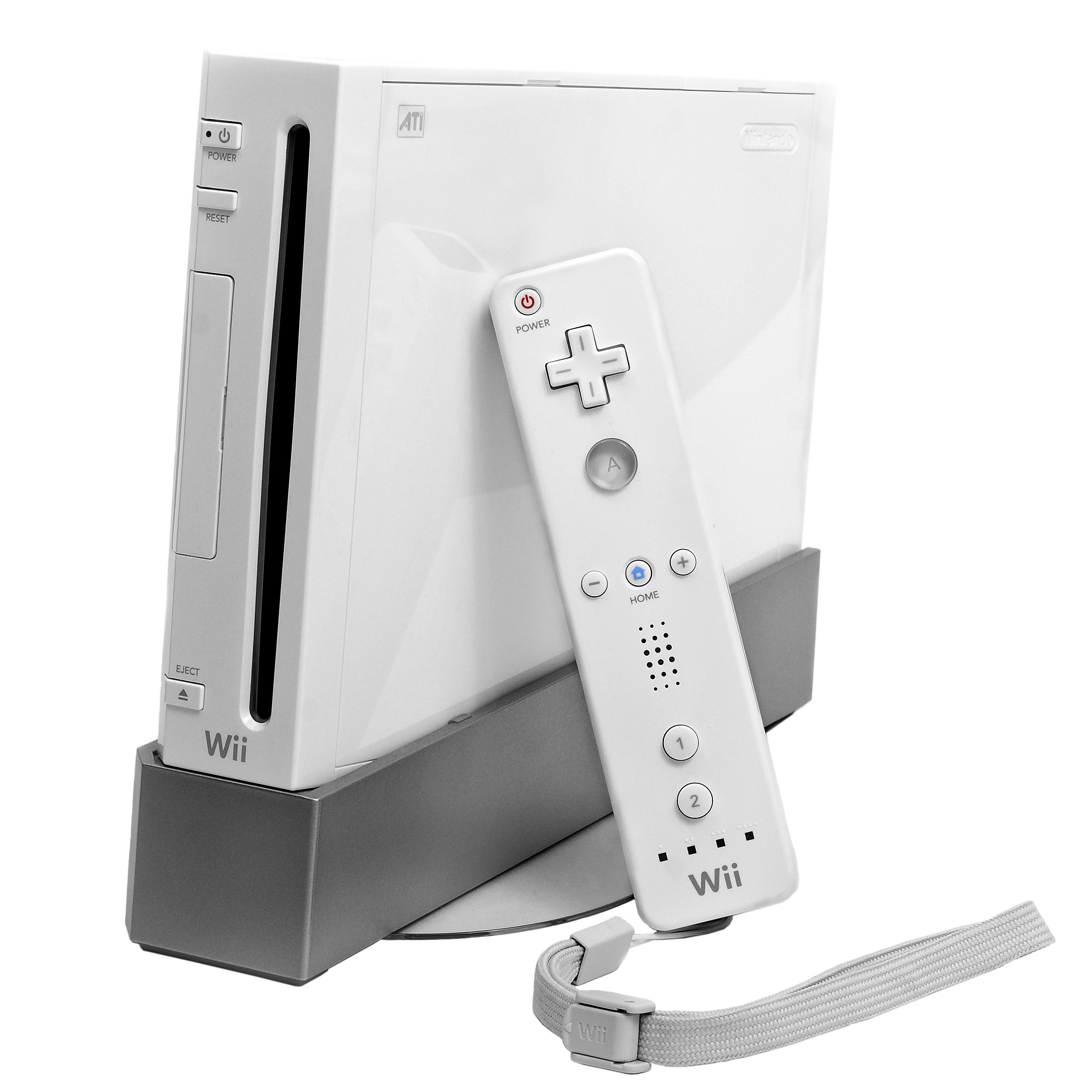
Nintendo's Wii (2010) was the best selling console of the seventh generation, selling 92.4 million units.

The seventh generation of video game consoles entered the market in the mid-2000s with the release of the Xbox 360, PlayStation 3, and Wii. These three consoles dominated the video game scene throughout much of the early 2010s as well. Each console brought with them a new breakthrough in technology. The Xbox 360 offered games rendered natively at HD resolutions. In addition to HD games, Sony's PlayStation 3 featured a built in Blu-ray player. Nintendo, having opted out of the HD race, focused more on mobility and interaction. All three major consoles expanded their overall use by doubling as media centers, featuring Wi-Fi internet connectivity, and allowing the use of apps.

Regarding the handheld market, Nintendo's evolving DS series of handhelds and Sony's PlayStation Portable dominated the market throughout much of the late 2000s. The Nintendo DS introduced a dual screen, as well as touchscreen gaming. The PSP was Sony's first attempt at competing in the handheld market and featured multiple ports to other devices, improved graphics, and is known for being the first handheld video game device to use an optical disc format.

=== Eighth generation consoles (2012–present) ===
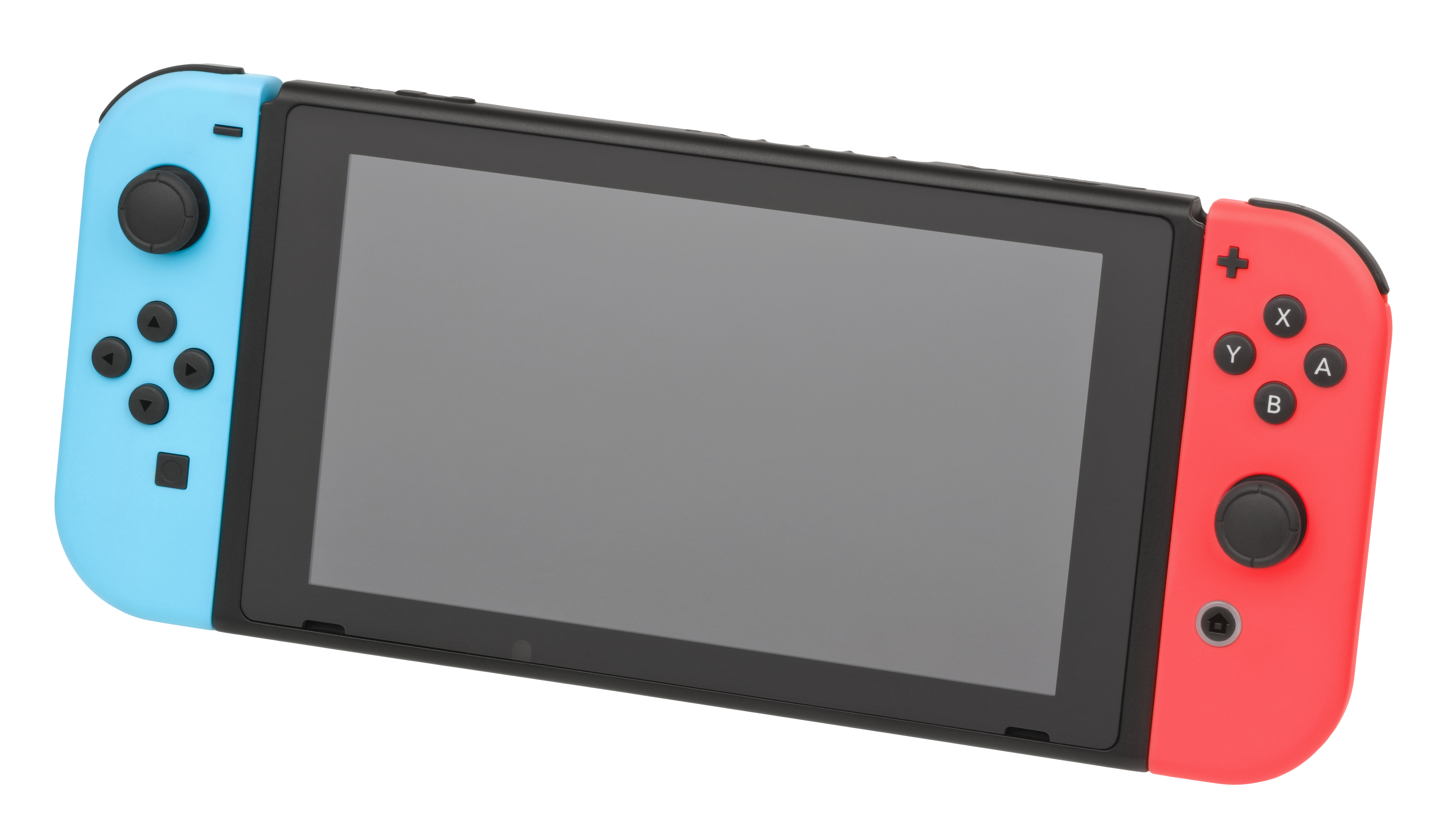
Nintendo Switch

The seventh generation of video game consoles followed a longer than usual console cycle. Nintendo was the first of the big three companies to announce their next generation console, doing so at E3 2011 with the unveiling of the Wii U, the successor to the Wii. The Wii U was released in North America, Europe, Australia and New Zealand in November 2012 and in Japan the following month. Reception to the console was mixed, with many reviewers criticising the limited choice of launch games available.

Both Microsoft and Sony announced their offerings in the eighth generation in 2013. On May 21, just weeks before E3 2013, Microsoft revealed its "all-in-one entertainment device," the Xbox One. Reaction among the press and gamers was mixed, with many gamers criticizing DRM-related restrictions and persistent internet requirements. E3 in June saw Microsoft reveal a November launch date for the Xbox One and Sony unveil its eighth generation console, the PlayStation 4. The PlayStation 4 received an enthusiastic response from the attendees after it was revealed it would lack DRM restrictions and online requirements and have a cheaper launch price than the Xbox One, leading some commentators to declare Sony the winner of E3. In the week following E3, Microsoft announced a reversal of its online and used games restrictions after substantial negative feedback.

The eighth generation was further elongated with the release of the PS4 Pro and the Xbox One X, both more-powerful variations of their predecessors capable of displaying video games in 4K resolution, as well as the Nintendo Switch, a hybrid portable-home video game console meant to replace the Wii U. The Wii U was discontinued following the release of the Switch in March 2017.

Handheld gaming in the eighth generation was dominated primarily by the Nintendo 3DS and the PlayStation Vita. The Nintendo 3DS is the first video game device to feature 3D gaming without the need for stereoscopic glasses. Sony's Vita is the successor to the PSP. Both systems are backward compatible. Nvidia also announced its intention to market a handheld video game device.

The eighth generation consoles were expected to face stiff competition from tablet and smartphone video game markets, online services and dedicated consoles based on cheap technology and free-to-play games or low cost downloadable content away from big budget blockbusters, as well as an increased interest in independent games promoted by popular social networking sites.

== History ==
=== Impact of the Great Recession on the video game industry ===
The Great Recession affected the video game industry. Many electronic gadgets, including video games, were perceived to be luxury items. Market shifts at the time towards mobile and casual gaming also led to a dip in overall sales.

=== New Dimensions ===
Following the release of James Cameron's long-awaited film, Avatar in 2009, utilizing stereoscopic 3D technology became a staple in the early 2010s in the production and services of television, as well as video games. Nintendo released the first video game device to feature stereoscopic 3D visuals without the need for special glasses with the 3DS handheld.

In a related trend, Sony unveiled "dual-view" at E3 2011. Dual view technology provides the capability of playing multiplayer games on the same screen without splitting it by overlaying the two images on top of each other.

=== Cloud-based and subscription gaming ===
Cloud gaming, or sometimes known as gaming on demand, is a technology in which the actual game and saved data is stored on a company's server, and users play the game over a stable internet connection. One major advantage to cloud gaming is the absence of a compact disc or cartridge required for use. In 2010, the OnLive gaming console debuted becoming the first console to exclusively feature cloud-based gaming. As the decade progressed, even some of the major players began to look into utilizing cloud gaming on their systems. In early 2012, it was the fastest-growing segment of the video game market.

In 2013, Julie Uhrman began a Kickstarter campaign to raise funding for her cloud-based video game console, the Ouya. The Ouya outdid their goal by raising over US$8.5 million, becoming that site's second-highest-earning project at the time. It operates with technology from Android, and features customization to the device's cover.

During a press conference at the 2014 Consumer Electronics Show, Sony unveiled PlayStation Now, a subscription-based streaming service that allows the PlayStation 4 to play previous console titles over the internet. Sony had recommended users to have at least a 5 Mbit/s internet connection speed for what they termed "good performance." Now was released in closed beta in January 2014, and was planned to be released to the public later in 2014. Now was released to consumers in North America on January 13, 2015, and steadily released across Europe from 2016 to 2019. The service was discontinued and merged with PlayStation Plus in 2022.

Cloud gaming is expected, by many video game experts, to challenge the dominance of the major video game corporations, and may eventually lead to the decline of console gaming entirely.

=== Tablet-based, smartphone, and social networking gaming ===
As transformative as the iPad was to the tablet PC industry, it also had a lasting effect on the video game world as well. Apple's high-resolution displays and mobile graphics processors set a high bar on graphical capabilities that rivaled some of the major handheld video game devices. As of 2014, nearly half of the Top-25 paid applications on the iPad App Store were games. Despite not having a controller, mobile devices and games continued to become a staple of the "casual gaming" market.

=== Mobility ===
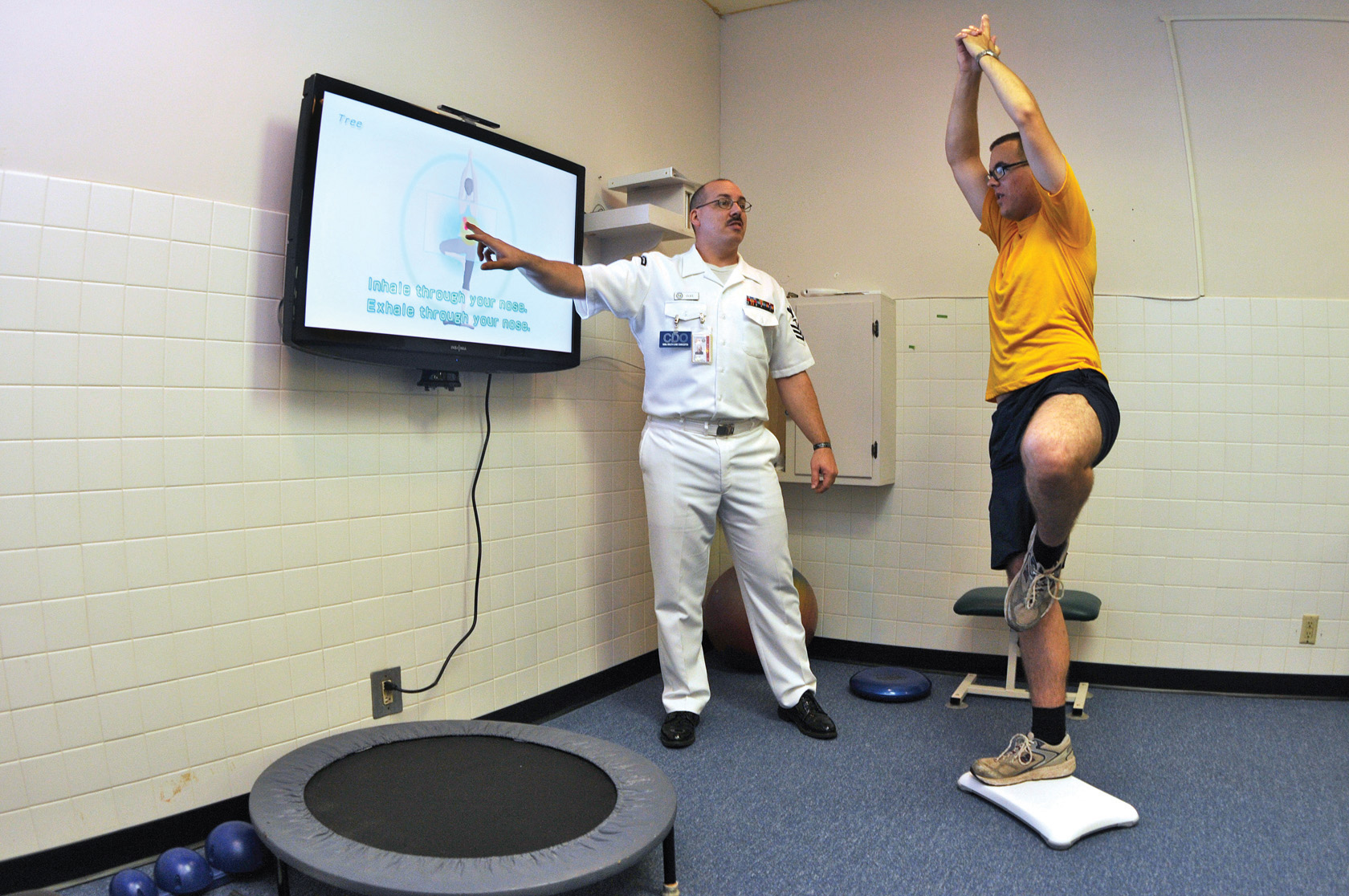
A video game is used during a physical therapy session at the Naval Health Clinic in Charleston.

Ever since Nintendo released the original Wii in 2006, mobility and interaction became a major focus to the video game world. It encouraged activity with gaming beyond the traditional controller, and expanded the market to include the elderly and those interested in physical therapy. Microsoft and Sony did not respond to Nintendo's motion sensor technology until 2010 when they released Kinect and PlayStation Move, respectively. The Kinect took further advantage of motion control by not requiring a controller at all.

In September 2012, Yosh Engineering unveiled a new immersive motion capture, virtual reality program. The YEI 3-Space Sensor product line featured allows for highly accurate body and head tracking giving the wearer full freedom of mobility in a realistic virtual environment. Yosh Engineering showed that the technology was both adaptable to contemporary graphic requirements and that the wearer has a freedom to move about through 3D space.

In 2013, a Houston-based upstart named Virtuix began a Kickstarter campaign to develop the Omni, an omnidirectional treadmill that has potential applications for video games. Such a device, if ever released to the public, would allow a player to walk naturally in the virtual environment of a game.

=== Growing popularity of Let's Play videos ===
The decade also saw the growing popularity of Let's Play videos on YouTube and Twitch, where viewers could watch streamers play through games. The YouTube channels of notable streamers such as PewDiePie, who became the first person to reach 10 billion views in 2015, were among the most-subscribed of the decade.

=== Violence in video games controversy ===
In the aftermath of several mass shootings, namely the Aurora, Colorado theater shooting and the Sandy Hook Elementary School shooting, debate on whether or not there is a connection between violent video games and real-life violent acts re-emerged. Former United States President Barack Obama assigned his former Vice President, Joe Biden, to head a discussion with representatives for the gun and video game lobbies in early 2013. Several days later, Obama announced stricter legislation on guns and also proposed a $10 million study, to be headed by the CDC, on whether or not violent video games were encouraging violent behavior. Results inconclusive.

=== Identity Politics ===
Issues of sexism, racism and inclusion in video games came to the fore, as the demographic of gamers and public image of gaming, via investment firm projections, shifted away from the traditional view of a largely male, heterosexual, young and white/Asian audience. The Gamergate harassment campaign was a response to criticism of sexism in gaming by Anita Sarkeesian and others.

== Demographics ==
According to the Entertainment Software Association, the average age of a person who played video games in 2010 was 30.

== Notable video games of the decade ==
=== Notable franchises established in the 2010s ===
- A Plague Tale (2019)
- Alien: Isolation (2014)^{1}
- Amnesia (2010)
- Among the Sleep (2014)
- Alan Wake (2010)
- Among Us (2018)
- Astro Bot (2013)
- Baldi's Basics in Education and Learning (2018)
- Bendy and the Ink Machine (2017)
- Binding of Isaac (2011)
- Bravely Default (2012)
- Bridge Constructor (2011)
- Candy Crush Saga (2012)
- Clash of Clans (2012)
- Cities: Skylines (2015)
- Code Vein (2019)
- Crossy Road (2014)
- Control (2019)
- Cuphead (2017)
- Cut the Rope (2010)
- Dance Central (2010)
- Danganronpa (2010)
- Dark Souls (2011)
- Dead Cells (2018)
- Dead Island (2011)
- Death Stranding (2019)
- Destiny (2014)
- Dishonored (2012)
- Disney Infinity (2013)^{1}
- Doki Doki Literature Club! (2017)
- Don't Starve (2013)
- Dragon's Dogma (2012)
- Dying Light (2015)
- Endless (2012)
- Epic Mickey (2010)
- Firewatch (2016)
- Five Nights at Freddy's (2014)
- Flappy Bird (2013)
- Fortnite (2017)
- Frostpunk (2018)
- Fruit Ninja (2010) ^{1}
- Forza Horizon (2012)^{2}
- Game of Thrones (2011)^{1}
- Geometry Dash (2013)
- Gravity Rush (2012)
- Hellblade (2017)
- Helldivers (2015)
- Hello Neighbor (2017)
- Heroes of the Storm (2015)
- Hill Climb Racing (2012)
- Hollow Knight (2017)
- Homefront (2011)
- Horizon (2017)
- Hotline Miami (2012)
- Hyperdimension Neptunia (2010)
- Hyper Light Drifter (2016)
- Injustice (2013)^{2}
- Jetpack Joyride (2011)
- Job Simulator (2016)
- Jurassic World Evolution (2018)^{1}
- Kingdom Come: Deliverance (2018)
- Knack (2013)
- The Last of Us (2013)
- The Battle Cats (2014)
- Life Is Strange (2015)
- Little Nightmares (2017)
- Mario + Rabbids (2017)^{2}
- Metro (2010)
- Minecraft (2011)
- Middle-earth: Shadow of Mordor (2014)^{1}
- Ni no Kuni (2010)
- Nioh (2017)
- Octodad (2010)
- Octopath Traveler (2018)
- Ori (2015)
- Outlast (2013)
- Overwatch (2016)
- Oxenfree (2016)
- Payday (2011)
- Pillars of Eternity (2015)
- Planet (2016)
- Plants vs. Zombies: Garden Warfare (2014)^{2}
- PlayerUnknown's Battlegrounds (2017)
- Prison Architect (2015)
- Project CARS (2015)
- Rage (2011)
- Remnant (2019)
- Shovel Knight (2014)
- Skylanders (2011)
- Slay the Spire (2019)
- Slender (2012)
- Slime Rancher (2017)
- Smite (2014)
- Sniper: Ghost Warrior (2010)
- Marvel's Spider-Man (2018)^{1}
- Splatoon (2015)
- State of Decay (2013)
- SteamWorld (2010)
- Star Wars Jedi (2019)^{1}
- Subnautica (2018)
- Subway Surfers (2012)
- Super Meat Boy (2010)
- Talking Tom (2010)
- Temple Run (2011)
- The Jackbox Party Pack (2014) ^{2}
- The Banner Saga (2014)
- The Evil Within (2014)
- The Outer Worlds (2019)
- Titanfall (2014)
- Tom Clancy's The Division (2015)^{2}
- Transport Fever (2024)
- Two Point (2018)
- Undertale (2015)
- Unravel (2016)
- Until Dawn (2015)
- Where's My Water? (2011) ^{1} ^{2}
- The Walking Dead (2012)^{1}
- The Dark Pictures Anthology (2019)
- Watch Dogs (2014)
- Xenoblade Chronicles (2010)
- Yo-kai Watch (2013) ^{1}

Notes:

- ^{1}Game franchises that also accompany major film or television franchises.
- ^{2}Game franchises that are considered spin-offs of previously established franchises.

=== Highest-grossing games ===
The following table lists the top ten highest-grossing video games of the decade, in terms of worldwide revenue (including buy-to-play, free-to-play, pay-to-play, digital purchases, microtransactions and subscriptions) across all platforms (including mobile, PC and console platforms). Among the top ten highest-grossing games of the decade, eight of them are free-to-play titles, five of which are published or owned by Chinese conglomerate Tencent.

Highest-grossing video games of the 2010s (as of December 2019)
No.	Title	Gross revenue	Initial release date	Platform(s)	Genre(s)	Publisher(s)	Business model	Ref
1	Dungeon Fighter Online (DFO)	$12,000,000,000	August 2005 (Note: This list does not include revenue before 2010.)	PC	Beat 'em up, action RPG	Nexon / Tencent	Free-to-play	(Note: Dungeon Fighter Online (DFO): 2012–2016 – $6.8 billion+; As of 2016 – $8.7 billion; As of 2011 – $1.8 billion+; 2017–2018 – $3.6 billion; 2019 – $1.6 billion)
2	Crossfire	$11,068,000,000	May 3, 2007	PC / Mobile	FPS, tactical shooter	Smilegate / Tencent	Free-to-play	(Note: Crossfire: 2011 – $1 billion; 2012 – $1 billion; 2013 – $1 billion; 2014 – $1.4 billion; 2015 – $1.11 billion; 2016 – $1.1 billion; 2017 – $1.605 billion; PC – $1.4 billion; Crossfire Mobile – $205 million; 2018 – $1.453 billion; 2019 – $1.4 billion)
3	League of Legends	$10,601,000,000	October 27, 2009	PC	MOBA	Riot Games / Tencent	Free-to-play	(Note: League of Legends: 2012 – $200 million; 2013 – $624 million; 2014 – $946 million; 2015 – $1.628 billion; 2016 – $1.7 billion; 2017–2018 – $4 billion; 2019 – $1.5 billion)
4	Fortnite	$9,186,000,000	July 25, 2017	Multi-platform	Battle royale, survival	Epic Games (Tencent)	Free-to-play	
5	Monster Strike	$8,252,000,000	August 8, 2013	Mobile	Physics, RPG	Mixi	Free-to-play	(Note: Monster Strike: As of October 2018 – $7.2 billion; November 2018 – $52 million+; December 2018 – $68 million+; 2019 – $932 million)
6	Honor of Kings / Arena of Valor	$8,120,000,000	November 26, 2015	Mobile / Switch	MOBA	Tencent Games (Tencent)	Free-to-play	(Note: Honor of Kings / Arena of Valor: 2016 – $1.61 billion+; 2017–2018 – $4.91 billion; 2019 – $1.6 billion)
7	Puzzle & Dragons	$7,703,000,000	February 20, 2012	Mobile	Puzzle	GungHo Online Entertainment (SoftBank Group)	Free-to-play	(Note: Puzzle & Dragons: As of October 2018 – $7 billion; 2019 (Japan) – ¥77.6 billion ($712 million))
8	World of Warcraft	$6,849,000,000	November 23, 2004	PC	MMORPG	Blizzard Entertainment (Activision Blizzard)	Subscription / pay-to-play	(Note: World of Warcraft: 2010 – $1.23 billion; 2011 – $1 billion; 2012 – $986 million; 2013 – $1.041 billion; 2014 – $728 million; 2015 – $814 million; 2017–2018 – $1.05 billion)
9	Clash of Clans	$6,634,200,000	August 2, 2012	Mobile	Strategy	Supercell (SoftBank Group / Tencent)	Free-to-play	(Note: Clash of Clans: Up until March 2019 – $6.4 billion; June 2019 – $76 million; December 2019 – $158.2 million)
10	Grand Theft Auto V / Online	$6,595,000,000	September 17, 2013	Multi-platform	Action-adventure	Rockstar Games (Take-Two Interactive)	Buy-to-play	(Note: Grand Theft Auto V and Online: 2013–2018 – $6 billion; 2019 – $595 million)

=== Best-selling games ===
The following table lists video games of the 2010s that have sold at least 10 million copies. The list only includes buy-to-play titles, and does not include free-to-play or subscription titles. The company that published the most number of games with over 10 million sales during the decade was Nintendo, with fifteen titles on the list.

Best-selling video games of the 2010s (as of December 2019)
No.	Title	Units sold	Initial release date	Platform(s)	Genre(s)	Developer(s)	Publisher(s)	Ref
1	Minecraft	180,000,000 (Note: Sales figure includes paid mobile downloads)	November 18, 2011	Multi-platform	Sandbox, survival	Mojang	Xbox Game Studios	
2	Grand Theft Auto V	115,000,000	September 17, 2013	Multi-platform	Action-adventure	Rockstar North	Rockstar Games	
3	PlayerUnknown's Battlegrounds (PUBG)	60,000,000	December 20, 2017	Multi-platform	Battle royale	PUBG Corporation, Bluehole	PUBG Corporation, Bluehole	
4	Mario Kart 8 / Deluxe	31,400,000	May 29, 2014	Multi-platform	Kart racing	Nintendo EAD	Nintendo	(Note: Mario Kart 8 sold 8.44 million units. Mario Kart 8 Deluxe sold 22.96 million units.)
5	The Elder Scrolls V: Skyrim	30,000,000	November 11, 2011	Multi-platform	Action role-playing	Bethesda Game Studios	Bethesda Softworks	
6	Diablo III and Reaper of Souls	30,000,000	May 15, 2012	Multi-platform	Action role-playing, hack and slash, dungeon crawl	Blizzard Entertainment	Blizzard Entertainment	
7	Terraria	27,000,000	May 16, 2011	Multi-platform	Action-adventure, sandbox	Re-Logic	Re-Logic, 505 Games	
8	Call of Duty: Modern Warfare 3	26,500,000	November 8, 2011	Multi-platform	First-person shooter	Infinity Ward, Sledgehammer Games	Activision	
8	Red Dead Redemption 2	26,500,000	October 26, 2018	Multi-platform	Action-adventure	Rockstar Studios	Rockstar Games	
10	Call of Duty: Black Ops	26,200,000	November 9, 2010	Multi-platform	First-person shooter	Treyarch	Activision	
11	Call of Duty: Black Ops II	24,200,000	November 13, 2012	Multi-platform	First-person shooter	Treyarch	Activision	
12	Kinect Adventures!	24,000,000	November 4, 2010	Xbox 360	Adventure, sports	Good Science Studio	Microsoft Game Studios	
12	FIFA 18	24,000,000	September 29, 2017	Multi-platform	Sports	EA Canada	EA Sports	
14	Borderlands 2	22,000,000	September 18, 2012	Multi-platform	Action-role playing, first-person shooter	Gearbox Software	2K Games	
15	The Witcher 3: Wild Hunt	20,000,000	May 19, 2015	Multi-platform	Action role-playing	CD Projekt Red	CD Projekt	
16	Call of Duty: Ghosts	19,000,000	November 5, 2013	Multi-platform	First-person shooter	Infinity Ward	Activision	
17	Mario Kart 7	18,470,000	December 1, 2011	Nintendo 3DS	Kart racing	Nintendo EAD, Retro Studios	Nintendo	
18	The Last of Us	17,000,000	June 14, 2013	Multi-platform	Action-adventure, survival horror	Naughty Dog	Sony Computer Entertainment	
19	Pokémon X and Y	16,420,000	October 12, 2013	Nintendo 3DS	Role-playing	Game Freak	The Pokémon Company, Nintendo	
20	Pokémon Sun and Moon	16,170,000	November 18, 2016	Nintendo 3DS	Role-playing	Game Freak	The Pokémon Company, Nintendo	
21	The Legend of Zelda: Breath of the Wild	16,040,000	March 3, 2017	Multi-platform	Action-adventure	Nintendo EPD	Nintendo	(Note: The Legend of Zelda: Breath of the Wild sold 14.54 million units on Nintendo Switch and 1.5 million units on Wii U)
22	Uncharted 4: A Thief's End	16,000,000	May 10, 2016	PlayStation 4	Action-adventure, third-person shooter, platformer	Naughty Dog	Sony Computer Entertainment	
23	Super Smash Bros. Ultimate	15,710,000	December 7, 2018	Nintendo Switch	Fighting	Bandai Namco Studios, Sora Ltd.	Nintendo	
24	Pokémon Black and White	15,640,000	September 18, 2010	Nintendo 3DS	Role-playing	Game Freak	The Pokémon Company, Nintendo	
25	Super Mario Odyssey	15,380,000	October 27, 2017	Nintendo Switch	Platformer	Nintendo EPD	Nintendo	
26	Monster Hunter: World	15,000,000	January 26, 2018	Multi-platform	Action role-playing	Capcom	Capcom	
27	Super Smash Bros. for Nintendo 3DS and Wii U	14,910,000	September 13, 2014	Multi-platform	Fighting	Bandai Namco Studios, Sora Ltd.	Nintendo	(Note: Super Smash Bros. for Nintendo 3DS sold 9.54 million units and Super Smash Bros. for Wii U sold 5.37 million units)
28	FIFA 13	14,500,000	September 25, 2012	Multi-platform	Sports	EA Canada	EA Sports	
29	Pokémon Omega Ruby and Alpha Sapphire	14,230,000	November 21, 2014	Nintendo 3DS	Role-playing	Game Freak	The Pokémon Company, Nintendo	
30	New Super Mario Bros. 2	13,270,000	July 28, 2012	Nintendo 3DS	Platformer	Nintendo EAD (Group No. 4)	Nintendo	
31	Marvel's Spider-Man	13,200,000	September 7, 2018	PlayStation 4	Action-adventure	Insomniac Games	Sony Interactive Entertainment	
32	Super Mario 3D Land	12,600,000	November 3, 2011	Nintendo 3DS	Platformer	Nintendo EAD Tokyo	Nintendo	
33	Animal Crossing: New Leaf	12,360,000	November 8, 2012	Nintendo 3DS	Social simulation	Nintendo EAD	Nintendo	
34	Fallout 4	12,000,000	November 10, 2015	Multi-platform	Action role-playing	Bethesda Game Studios	Bethesda Softworks	
35	Gran Turismo 5	11,940,000	November 24, 2010	PlayStation 3	Sim racing	Polyphony Digital	Sony Computer Entertainment	
36	Pokémon: Let's Go, Pikachu! and Let's Go, Eevee!	11,280,000	November 16, 2018	Nintendo Switch	Role-playing	Game Freak	The Pokémon Company, Nintendo	
37	New Super Mario Bros. U / Deluxe	10,380,000	November 18, 2012	Multi-platform	Platformer	Nintendo EAD	Nintendo	(Note: New Super Mario Bros. U sold 5.79 million units and New Super Mario Bros. U Deluxe sold 4.59 million units)
38	Horizon Zero Dawn	10,000,000	February 28, 2017	PlayStation 4	Action role-playing	Guerrilla Games	Sony Interactive Entertainment	
38	God of War	10,000,000	April 20, 2018	PlayStation 4	Action-adventure, hack and slash	Santa Monica Studio	Sony Interactive Entertainment	

=== Most-played games ===
Top ten most-played video games of the decade (as of December 2019)
No.	Game	Player count	Initial release date	Platform(s)	Genre	Publisher(s)	Business model	Ref
1	Pac-Man Doodle	1,000,000,000	May 21, 2010	Browser	Maze	Namco / Bandai Namco Entertainment / Google	Free-to-play	
1	Subway Surfers	1,000,000,000	May 24, 2012	Mobile	Endless runner	SYBO Games	Free-to-play	
1	Pokémon Go	1,000,000,000	July 6, 2016	Mobile	Augmented reality	Niantic / The Pokémon Company / Nintendo	Free-to-play	
4	Despicable Me: Minion Rush	900,000,000	June 10, 2013	Mobile	Endless runner	Gameloft / Vivendi	Free-to-play	
5	PUBG Mobile	600,000,000	December 20, 2017	Mobile	Battle royale	PUBG Corporation / Bluehole / Tencent Games	Free-to-play	
6	Fruit Ninja	500,000,000	April 21, 2010	Mobile	Arcade	Halfbrick Studios	Free-to-play	
6	Temple Run	500,000,000	August 4, 2011	Mobile	Endless runner	Imangi Studios	Free-to-play	
6	Jetpack Joyride	500,000,000	September 1, 2011	Mobile	Endless runner	Halfbrick Studios	Free-to-play	
6	Candy Crush Saga	500,000,000	April 12, 2012	Multi-platform	Puzzle	King / Activision Blizzard	Free-to-play	
10	Minecraft	480,000,000	November 18, 2011	Multi-platform	Sandbox	Mojang / Microsoft Game Studios	Buy-to-play / free-to-play	

=== Most acclaimed games ===
The following table lists the top ten video games of the decade based on their rankings on various publications' lists of the best video games of the decade. This list was determined by Metacritic, which used a points system based on how frequently certain games appeared on these lists and their rankings within the lists.

No.	Title	1st place	2nd place	Other rankings	Points
1	The Legend of Zelda: Breath of the Wild	18	4	16	78
2	The Last of Us	3	9	14	41
3	The Witcher 3: Wild Hunt	2	2	21	31
4	The Elder Scrolls V: Skyrim	1	1	23.5	28.5
5	Dark Souls	1	1	21	26
6	Grand Theft Auto V	1	0	19.5	22.5
7	Mass Effect 2	0	2	18	22
8	God of War	0	1	19.5	21.5
9	Minecraft	1	3	12	21
10	Red Dead Redemption 2	1	2	11	18

The following table lists the top ten video games of the decade based on Metacritic's aggregate review scores.

No.	Title	Average score
1	Super Mario Galaxy 2	97
2	The Legend of Zelda: Breath of the Wild	97
3	Red Dead Redemption 2	97
4	Grand Theft Auto V	97
5	Super Mario Odyssey	97
6	Mass Effect 2	96
7	The Elder Scrolls V: Skyrim	96
8	The Last of Us	95
9	The Last of Us Remastered	95
10	Red Dead Redemption	95

=== Most influential games ===
The following is a partial list of games considered to be the most influential of the 2010s.

- Amnesia: The Dark Descent (Frictional Games, 2010) - A revisioning of the survival horror genre which stripped away the ability to fight back against the threatening creatures, it helped not only to re-popularize the genre, but it helped popularize Let's Play videos on YouTube and launched the careers of YouTube streamers such as PewDiePie reacting to the jump scares in the game.
- Nier (Cavia, 2010) - Considered one of the most influential Japanese role-playing games of the decade.
- Dark Souls (FromSoftware, 2011) - Established the idea of intentionally-difficult games that required the player to carefully learn and improve their character through repeated failed attempts, and inspired the Soulslike genre.
- Minecraft (Mojang, 2011) - A highly successful sandbox game that allowed players to be as creative as they wanted to be, which helped to further entertainment options like machinima. Minecraft also demonstrated the successful approach to early access releases.
- The Elder Scrolls V: Skyrim (Bethesda Game Studios, 2011) - Considered the best example of a Western computer role-playing game.
- Puzzle & Dragons (GungHo Online Entertainment, 2012) - A gacha game that established the dominant "freemium" microtransaction model used by mobile games, as well as the loot box model used by both mobile and big-budget games. It was also the first mobile game to gross over $1 billion in revenue.
- Candy Crush Saga (King, 2012) - One of the first mobile games to successfully implement a "freemium" microtransaction model, establishing this model throughout the mobile game industry. Candy Crush Saga also helped turn a significant number of people into gamers.
- The Walking Dead: Season One (Telltale Games, 2012) - Revitalized the point-and-click adventure game genre which had gone by the wayside since the 1990s, as well as establishing the episodic release approach to narrative games.
- BioShock Infinite (Irrational Games, 2013) - An ambitious first-person shooter set in an alternate reality of the early 20th century. The game provided not only significant themes regarding politics and religion, but also touches on meta-commentary on the nature of choice within video games.
- Destiny (Bungie, 2014) - One of the first successful implementations of a games as a service model which provided frequent new content and updates over time.
- P.T. (Kojima Productions, 2014) - Considered to be possibly the most important horror game of the decade.
- The Witcher 3: Wild Hunt (CD Projekt, 2015) - While an open-world role-playing game designed after Skyrim, The Witcher 3 demonstrated a means to tightly integrate a story-driven narrative within an open-world game.
- Pokémon Go (Niantic, 2016) - Demonstrated a successful means of augmented reality games, and the potential for games that could be played in spurts of a few minutes that fit into most players' lifestyles.
- The Legend of Zelda: Breath of the Wild (Nintendo, 2017) - Breath of the Wild provided an atypical Legend of Zelda experience with an open-world driven game, but still holding to the core concepts of the franchise. It was a throwback to the open-world approach of the original Zelda; rather than telling players how to complete quests, it left it to players to figure it out for themselves and craft their own experience. It is considered the killer app that helped drive Nintendo Switch sales.
- PlayerUnknown's Battlegrounds (Bluehole, 2017) - PUBG was largely responsible for establishing and popularizing the battle royale game genre, inspired by the Japanese film Battle Royale and in turn inspiring numerous battle royale games (such as Fortnite). PUBG remains the most-played battle royale game in the world.
- Fortnite Battle Royale (Epic Games, 2017) - Contributed to increasing the popularity of the battle royale genre (inspired by PUBG), as well as leading a transition for some free-to-play games away from loot boxes to battle passes. Fortnite quickly exploded into the public consciousness and became prevalent throughout popular culture.
- Hollow Knight (Team Cherry, 2017) and Ori and the Blind Forest (Moon Studios, 2015) for greatly contributing to the popularity of the Metroidvania indie game renaissance.

== In popular culture ==
- In the 1989 film Back to the Future Part II, protagonist Marty McFly is sent into his future 2015, enters a 1980s-themed bar and encounters two children trying to figure out how to operate an old arcade game, Wild Gunman. When Marty gets the arcade game working, the kids react negatively describing a game that requires a player to use their hands as a "baby game."
- Tron: Legacy is released in 2010, and is a sequel to the 1982 film Tron, a film that takes place within the digital world of a video game. The franchise later got an animated television adaptation in 2012.
- The 2011 book Ready Player One and its 2018 film adaptation are based on a worldwide virtual reality game.
- The 2012 film Wreck-It Ralph centers on a video game villain who wishes to be a hero. Many references and cameos to other video games are present throughout the film. The film received a sequel in 2018.
- Frank Underwood, the protagonist in the Netflix political drama House of Cards (2013–2018) is an avid video gamer, and is often seen playing games like Call of Duty and mobile games in his spare time.
- Two films in the Jumanji franchise, Welcome to the Jungle (2017) and its sequel The Next Level (2019), were inspired by classic video games of the 1990s.
- The 2010 short film titled Pixels received a feature film adaptation released in 2015.
- Ace Attorney received both a film adaptation and an anime series releasing in 2012 and 2016 respectively.
- The Angry Birds franchise saw two film releases in the decade, The Angry Birds Movie (2016) and the sequel The Angry Birds Movie 2 (2019).
- Halo received an animated film with Halo Legends (2010) and web series in Halo 4: Forward Unto Dawn (2012)
- Street Fighter saw the release of three live action adaptations: Legacy (2010), Assassin's Fist (2014), and Resurrection (2016)
- Mortal Kombat had two web adaptations: Rebirth (2010) and Mortal Kombat: Legacy (2011)
- The Tekken series was given two films: Blood Vengeance (2011) and Tekken 2: Kazuya's Revenge (2014)
- Two Assassin's Creed movies came out during the decade with Assassin's Creed: Embers in 2011 and a live action feature film in 2016.
- Dead Rising got a feature film adaptation in 2015 with Dead Rising: Watchtower and a sequel the following year.

== Hardware timeline ==
The following gallery highlights hardware used to predominantly play games throughout the 2010s.

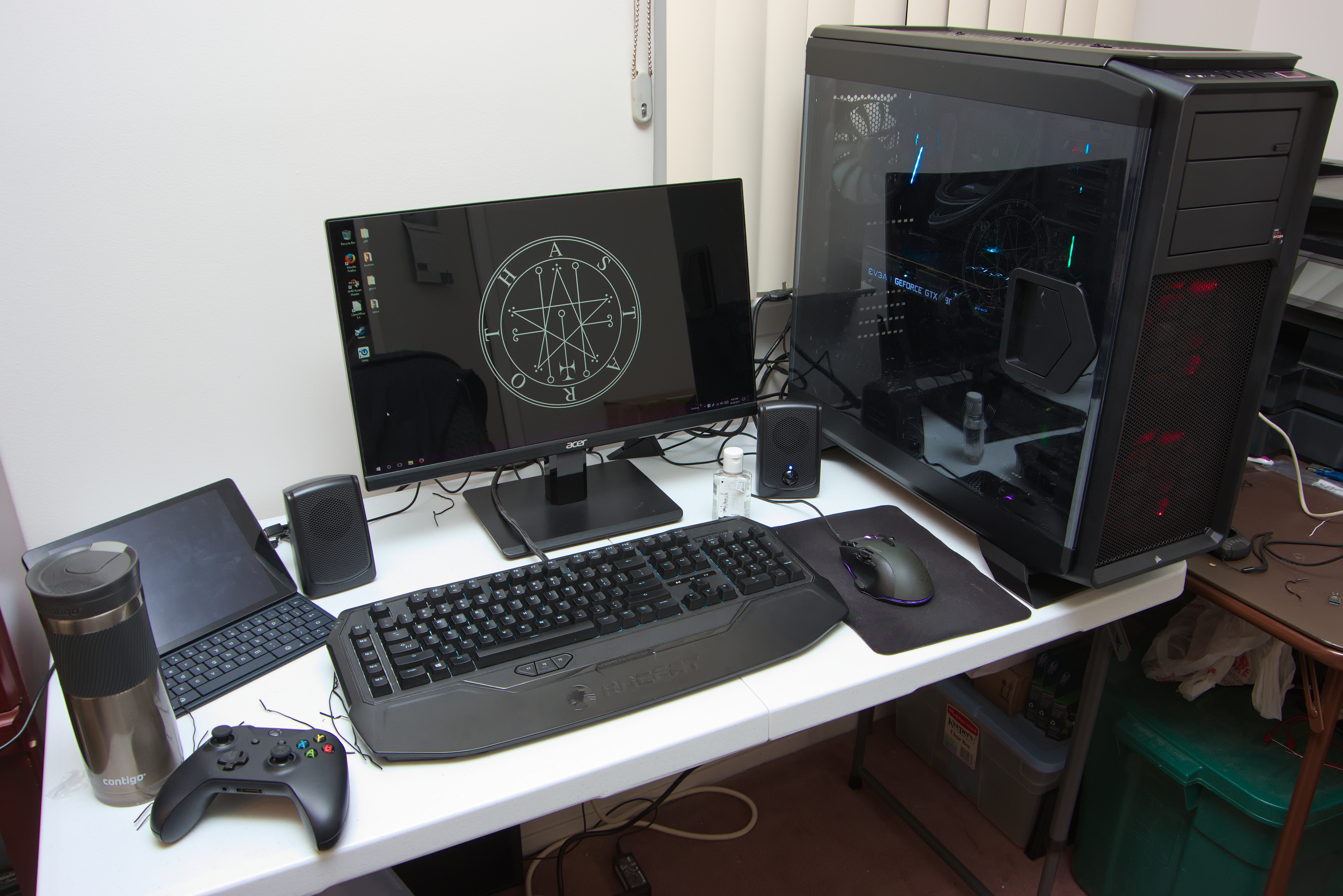
A desktop gaming PC setup from 2010s

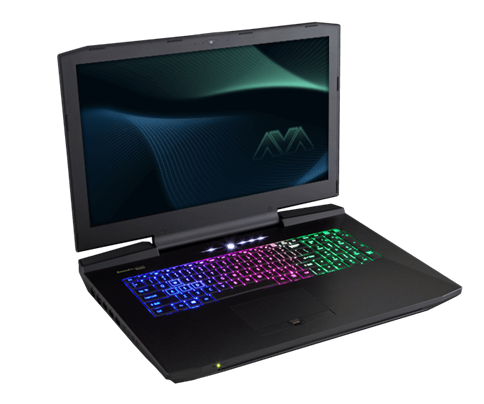
A laptop gaming PC from the 2010s

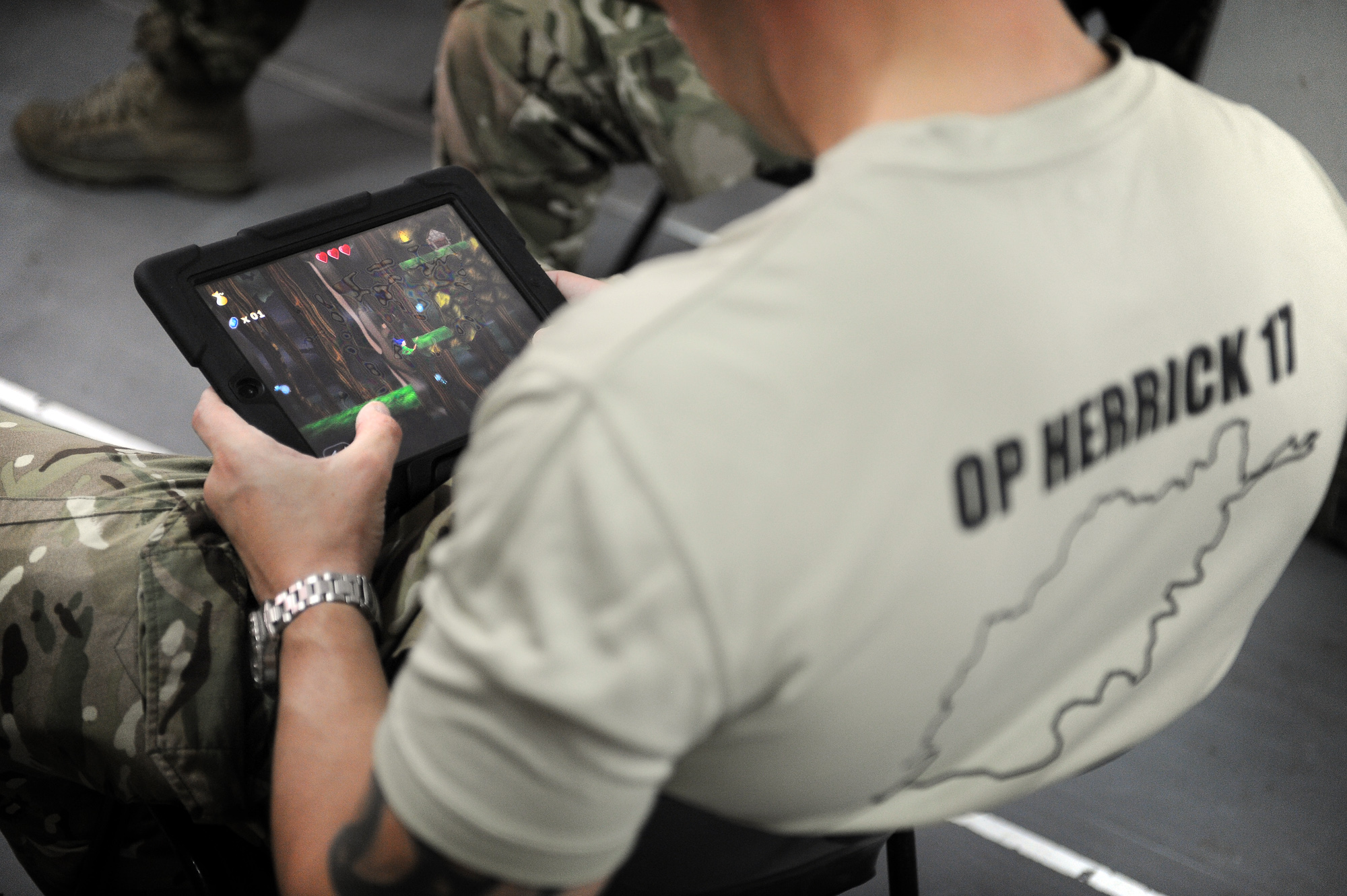
iPad (2010) and other tablet-PCs

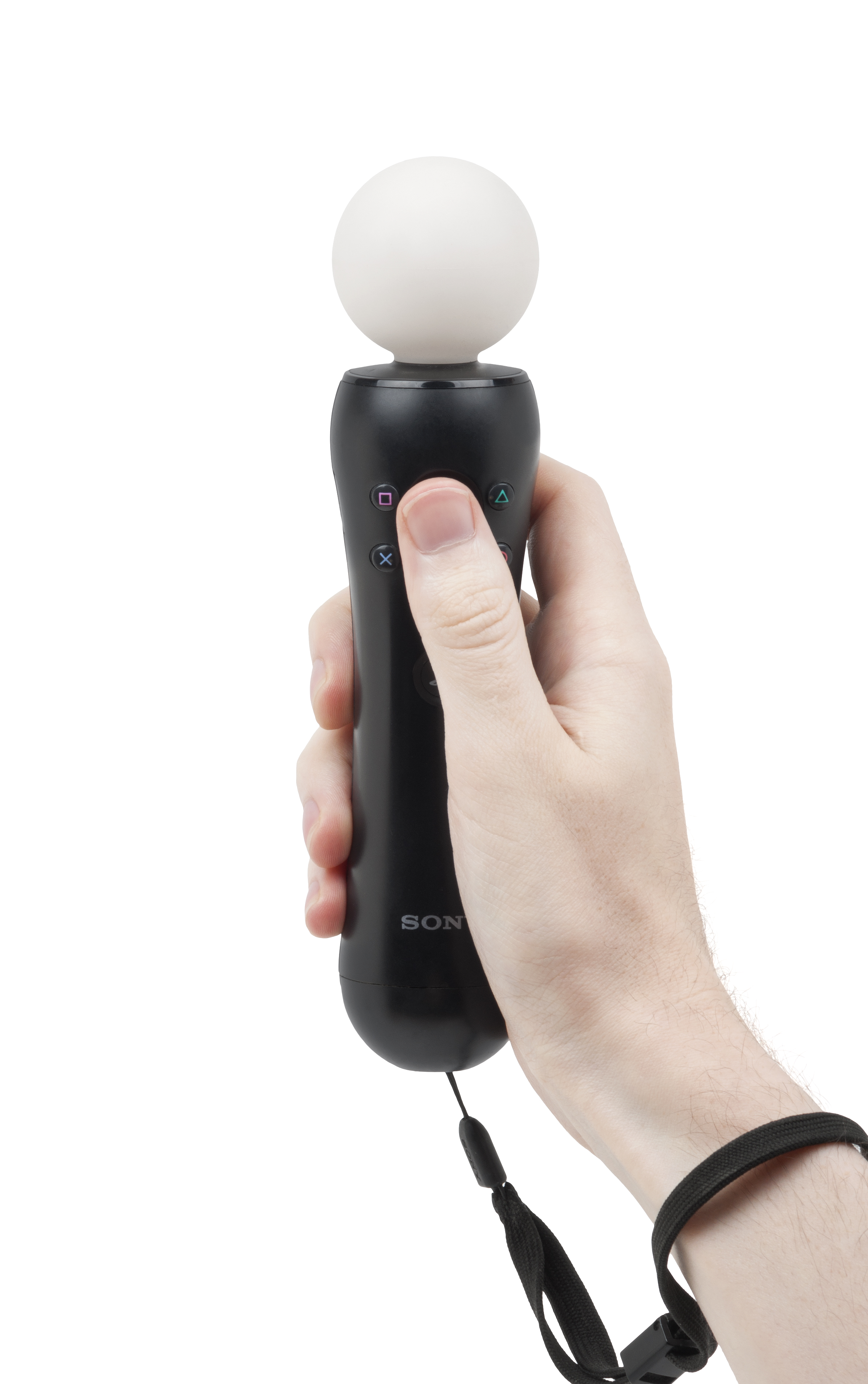
PlayStation Move (2010), accessory for the PlayStation 3

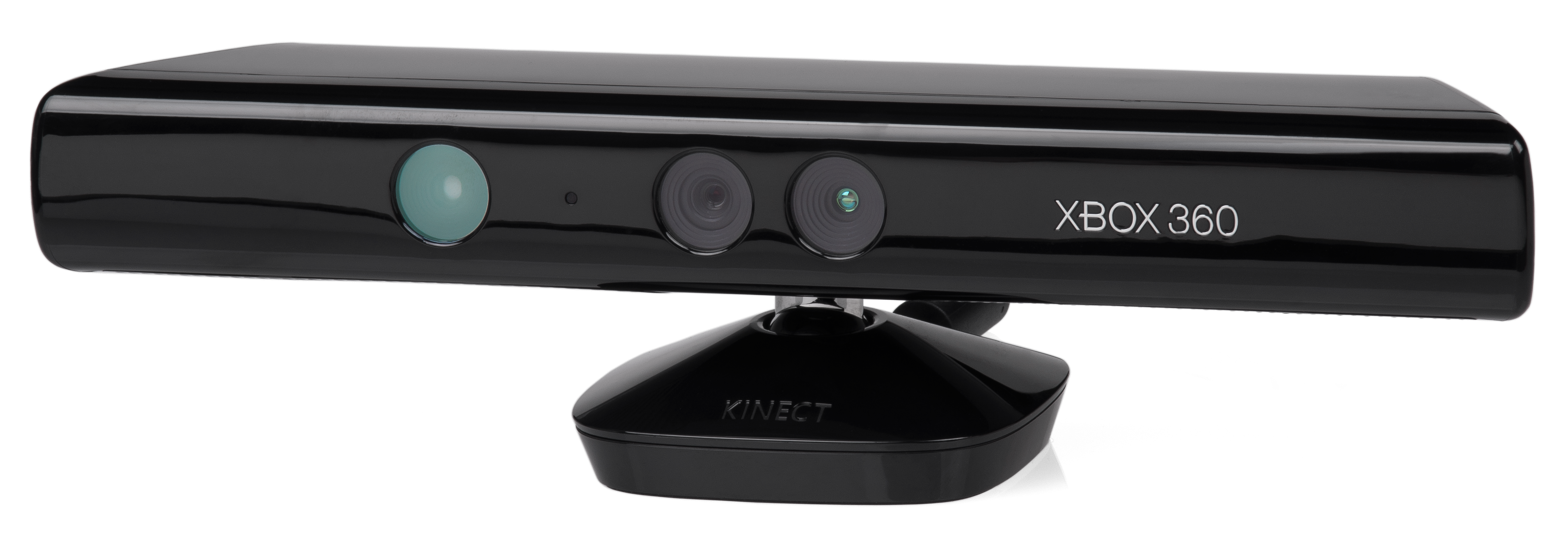
Kinect (2010), accessory for the Xbox 360

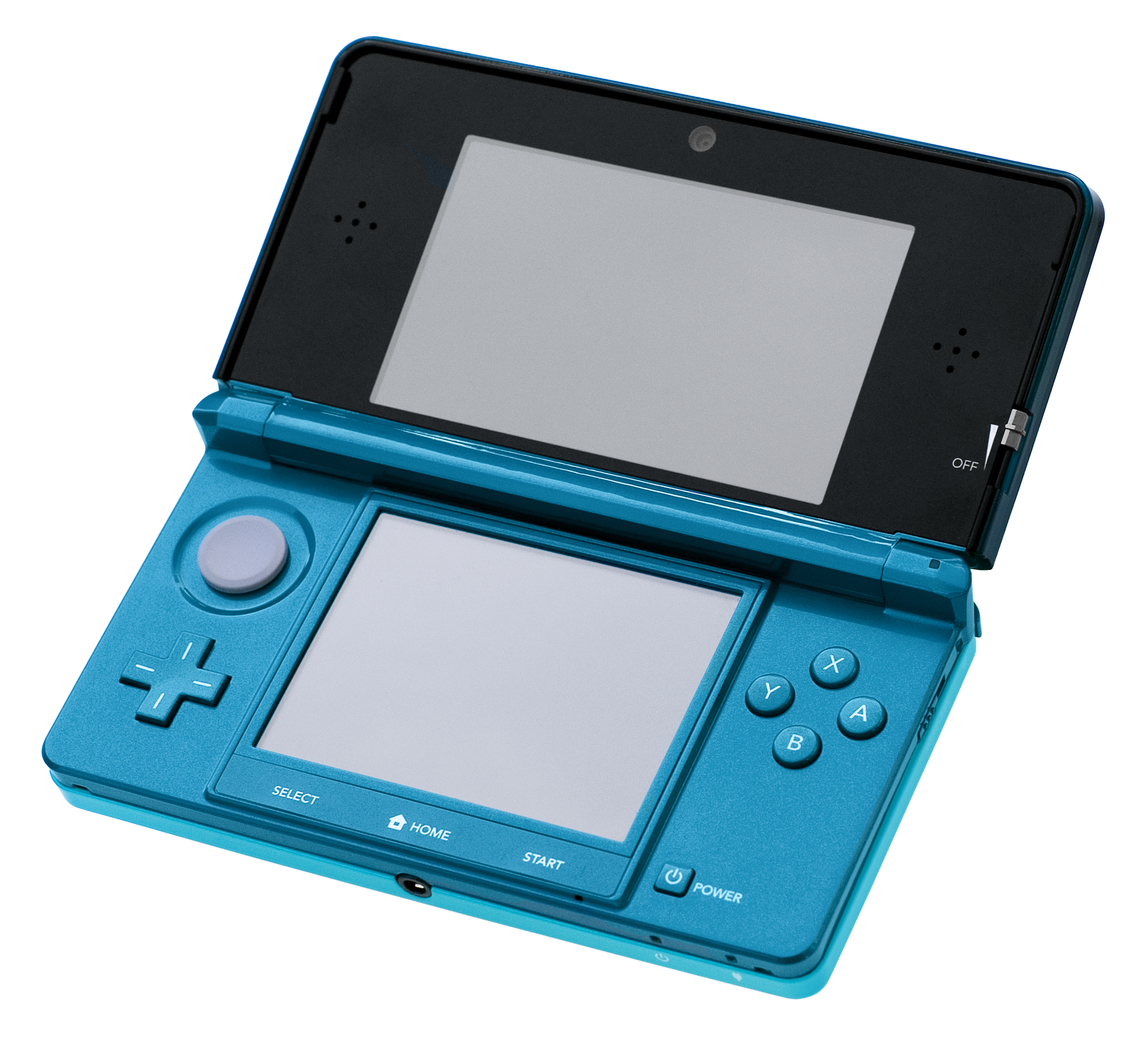
Nintendo 3DS (2011)

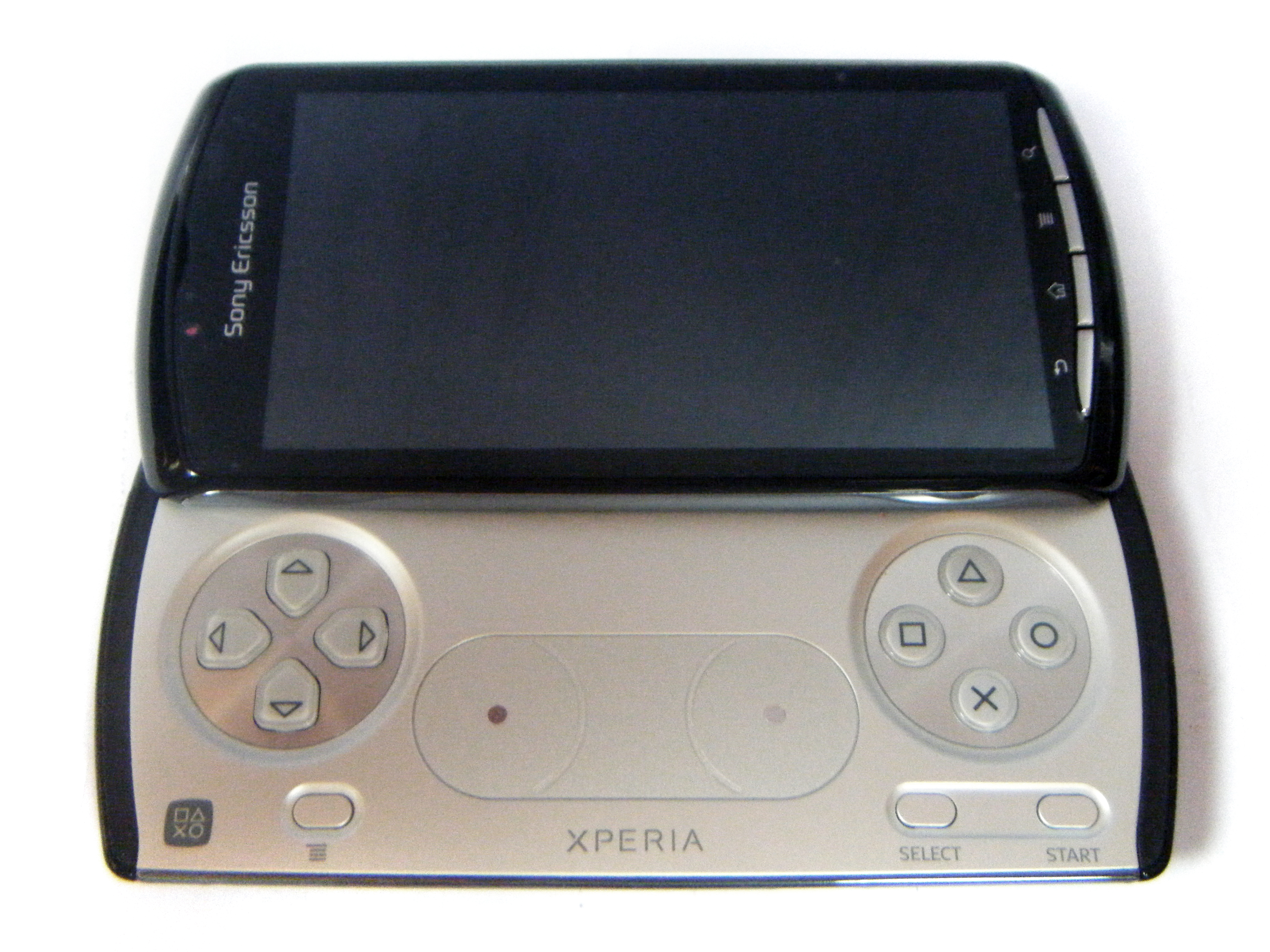
Xperia Play (2011)

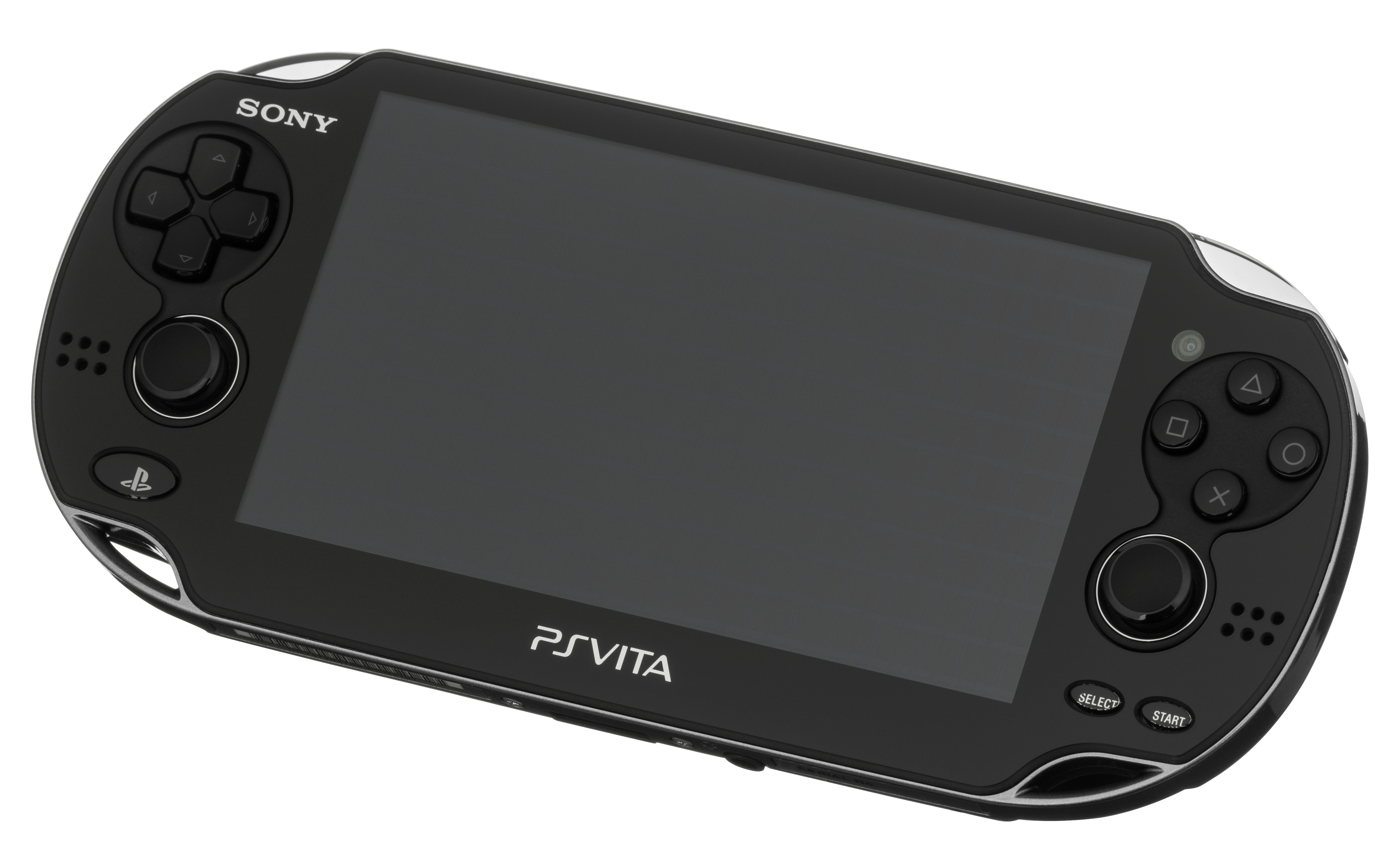
PlayStation Vita (2011)

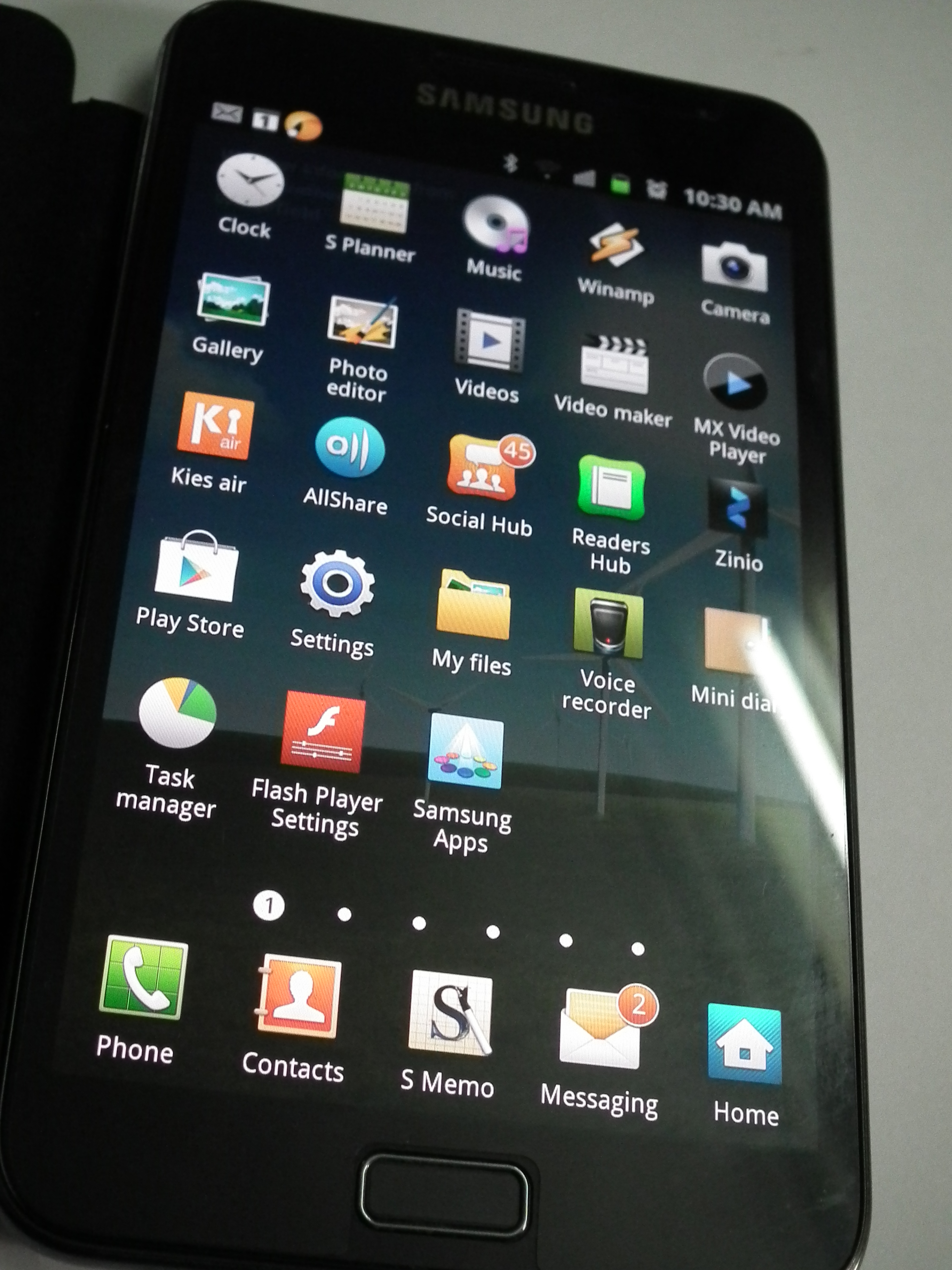
Samsung Galaxy Note (2011)

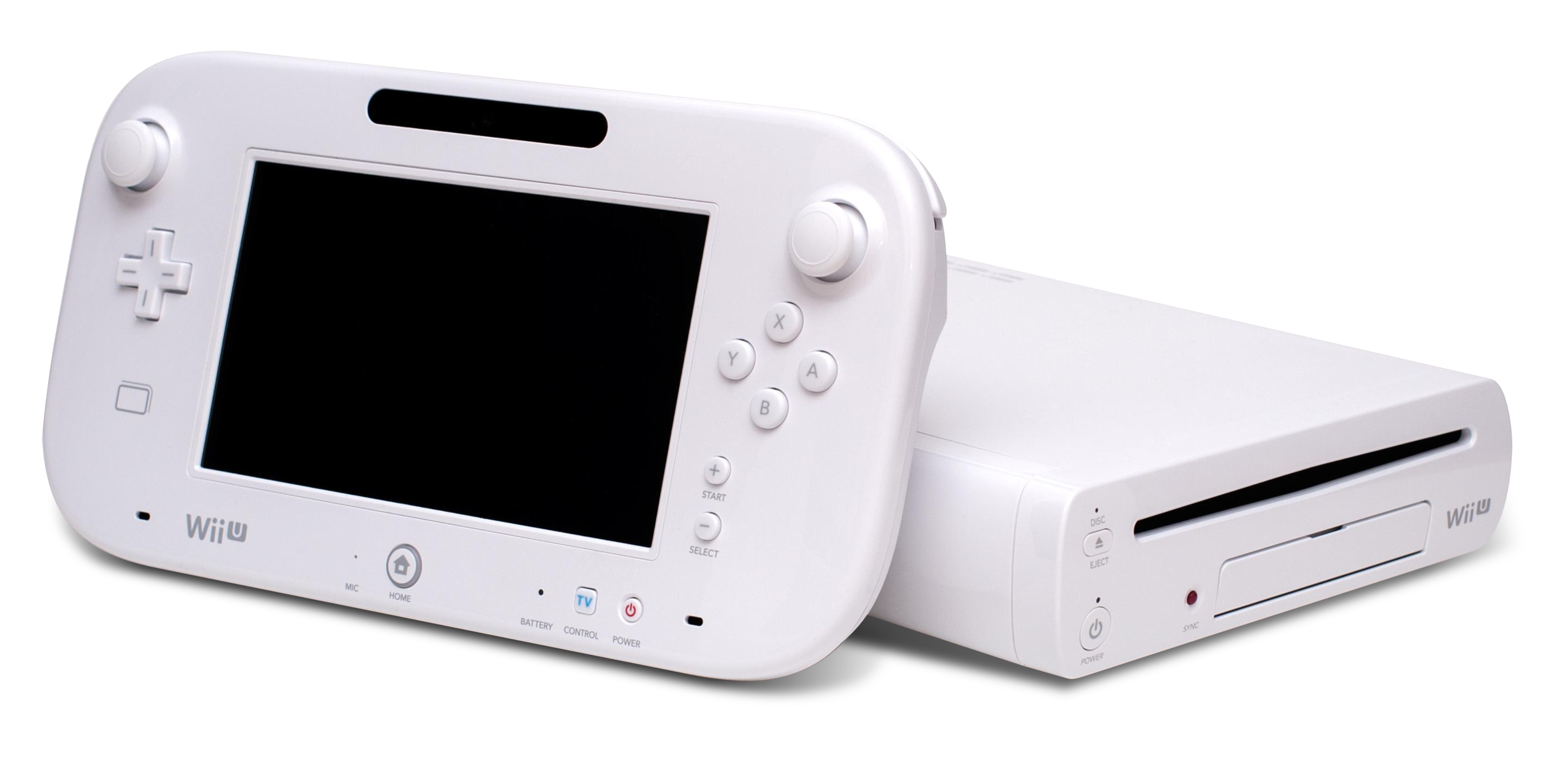
Wii U (2012)

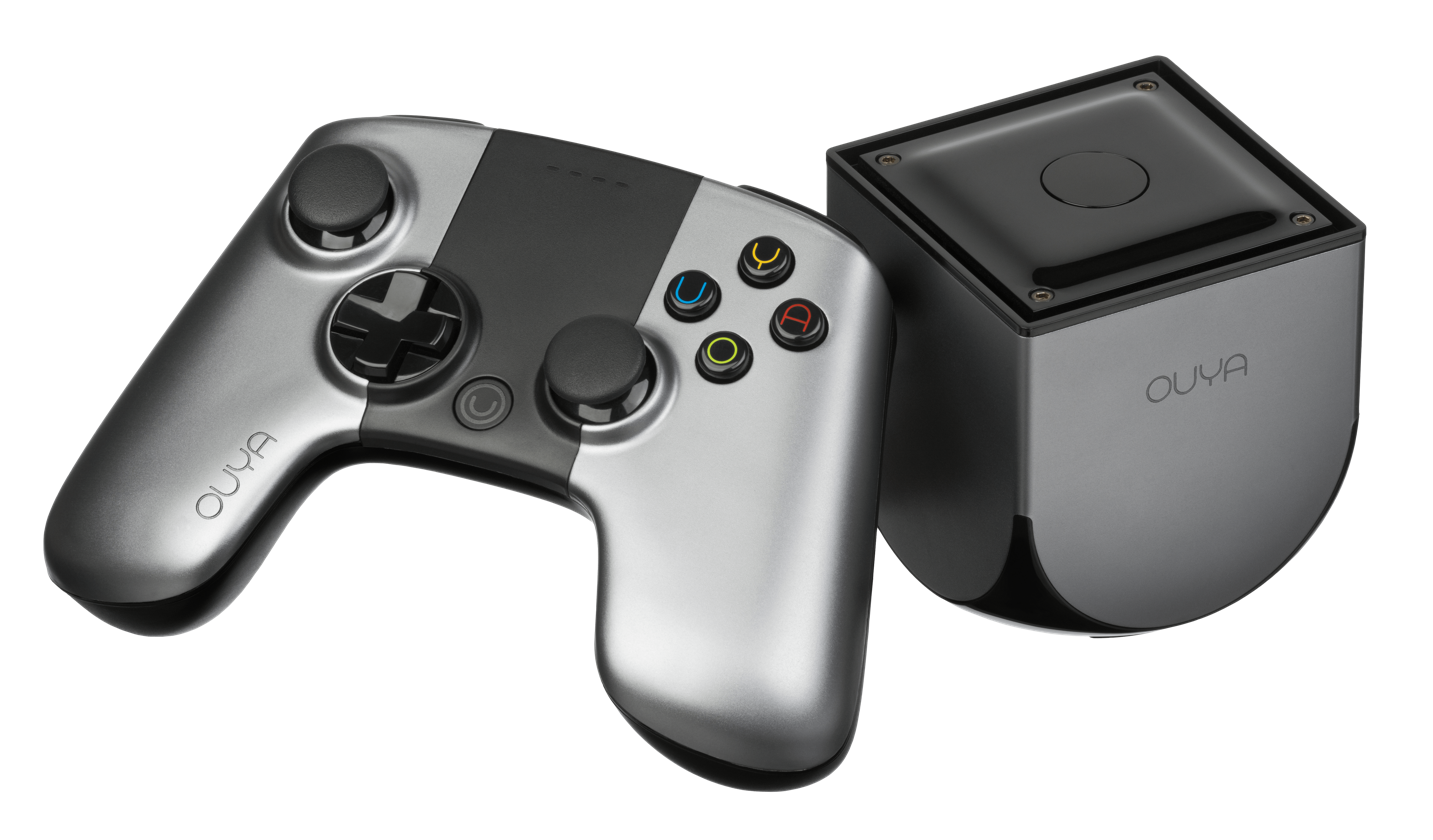
Ouya (2012)

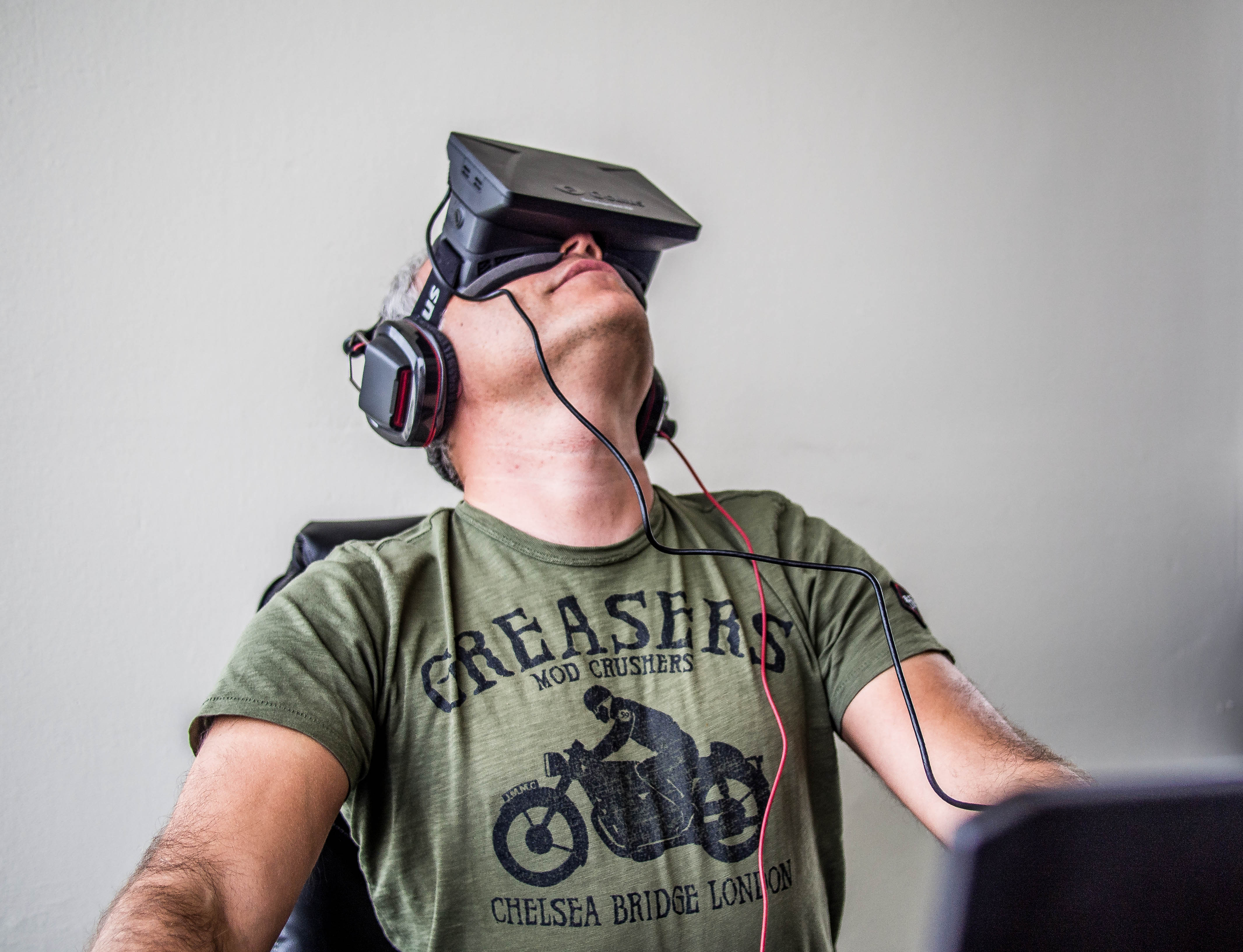
Oculus Rift VR-display (2012), accessory

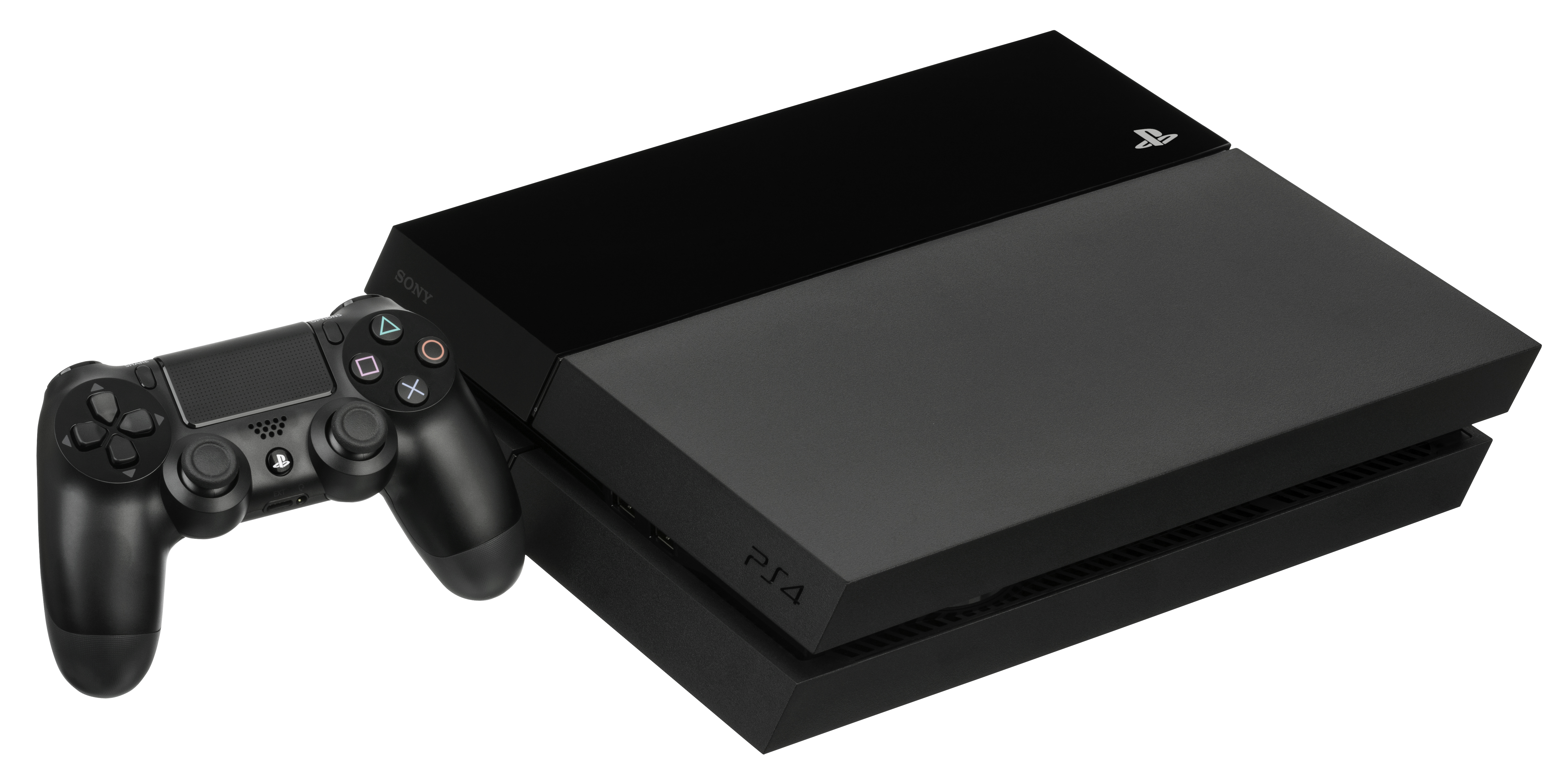
PlayStation 4 (2013)

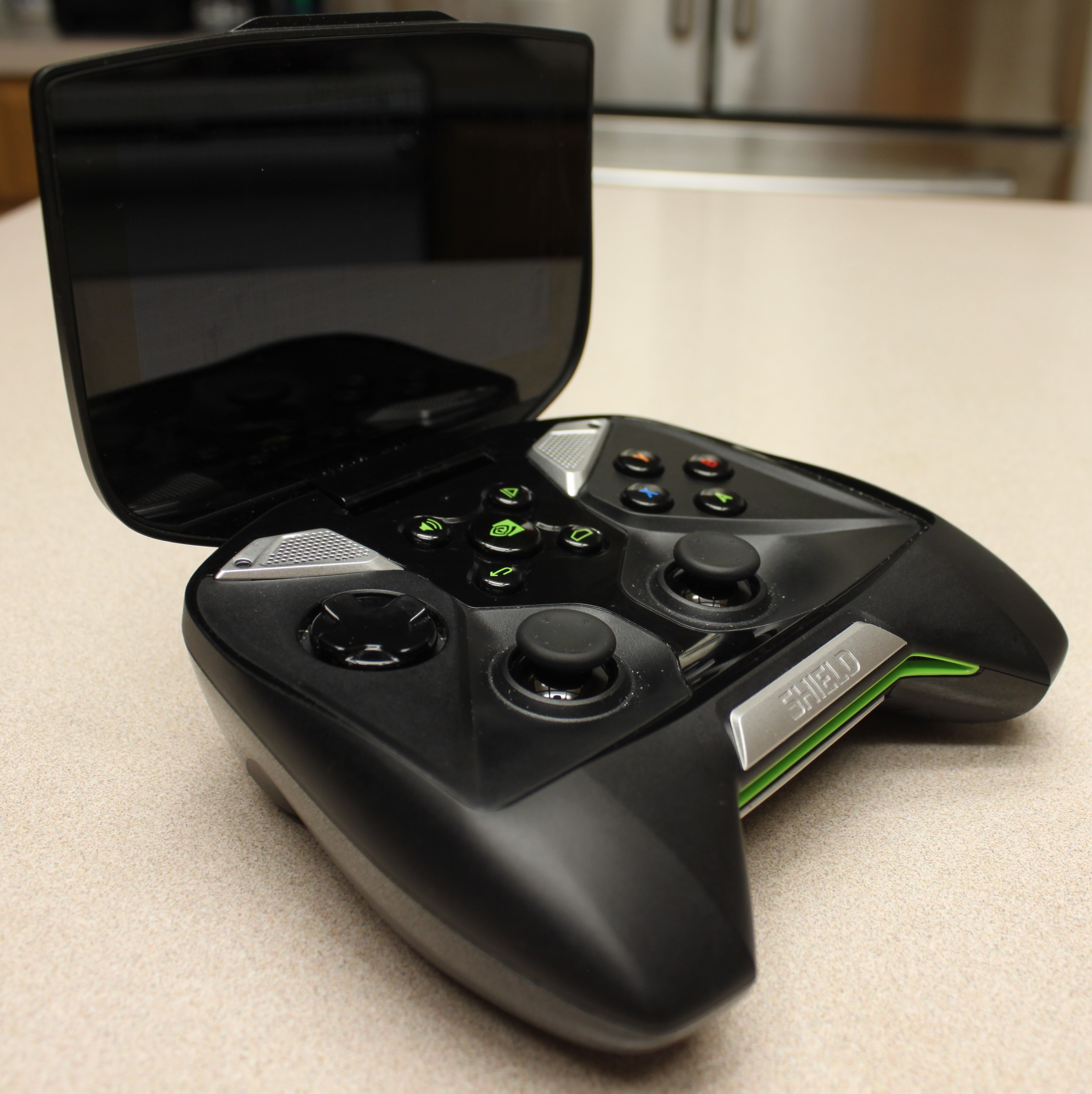
Nvidia Shield Portable (2013)

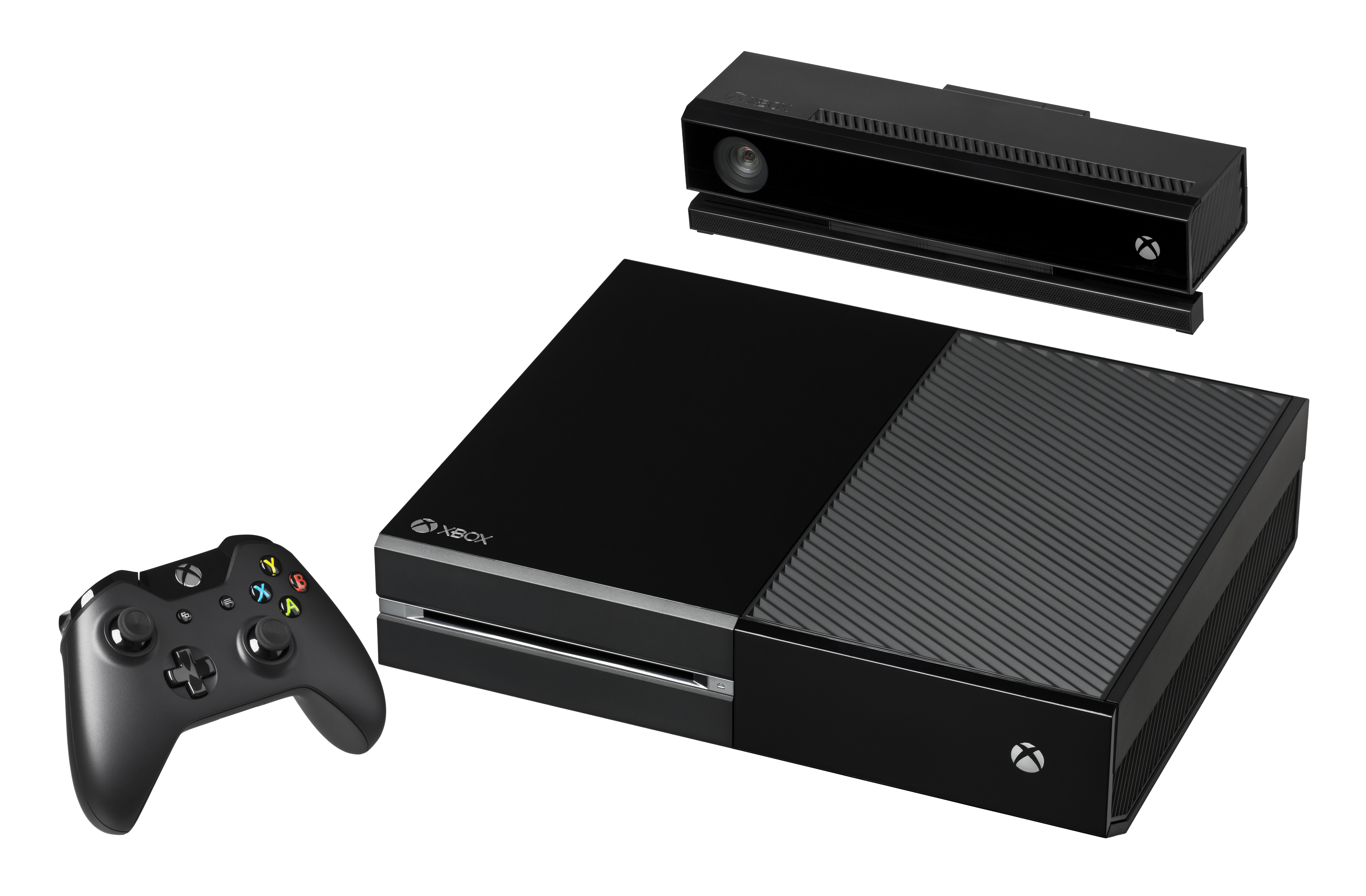
Xbox One (2013)

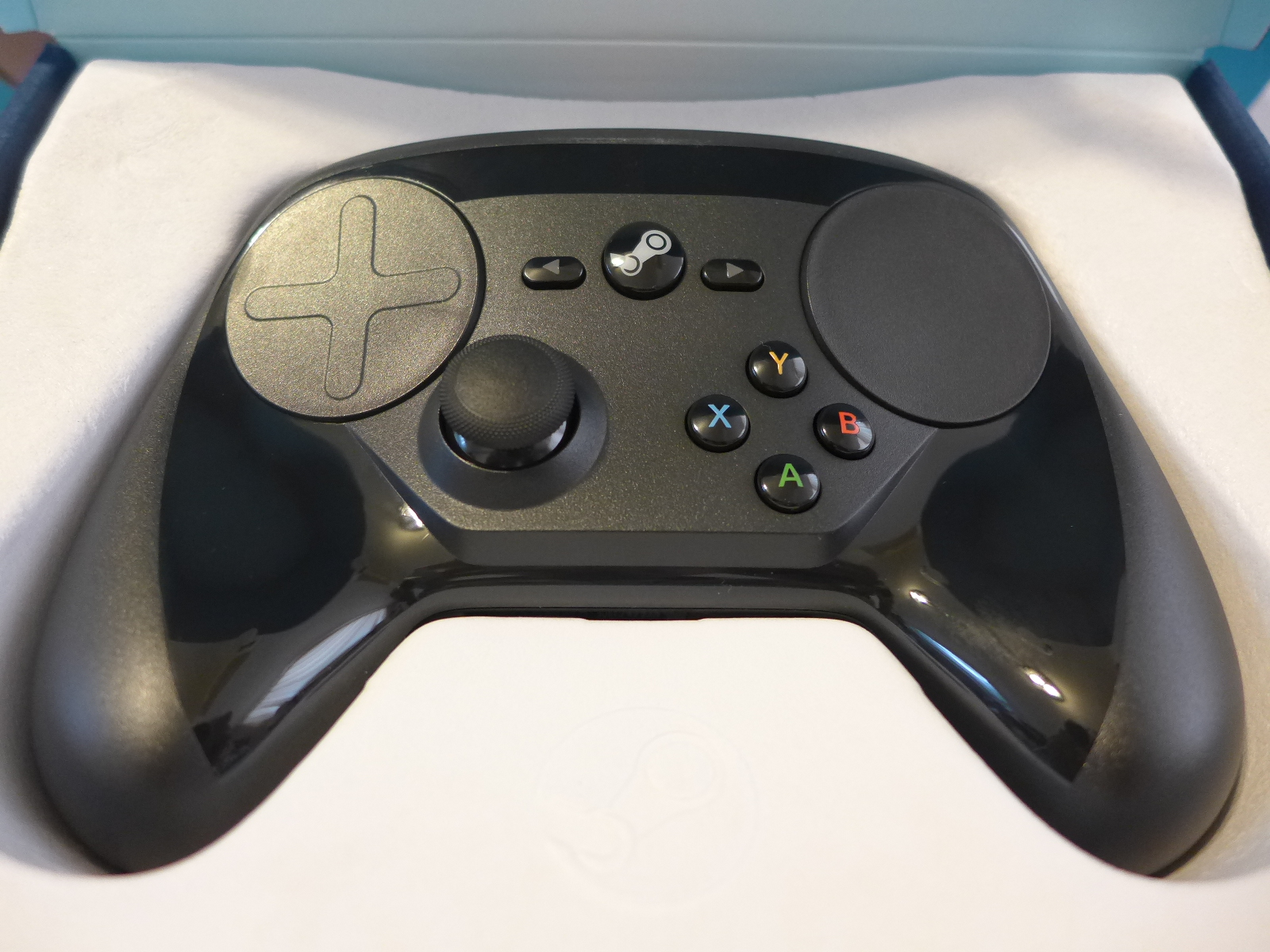
Steam Controller (1st generation)

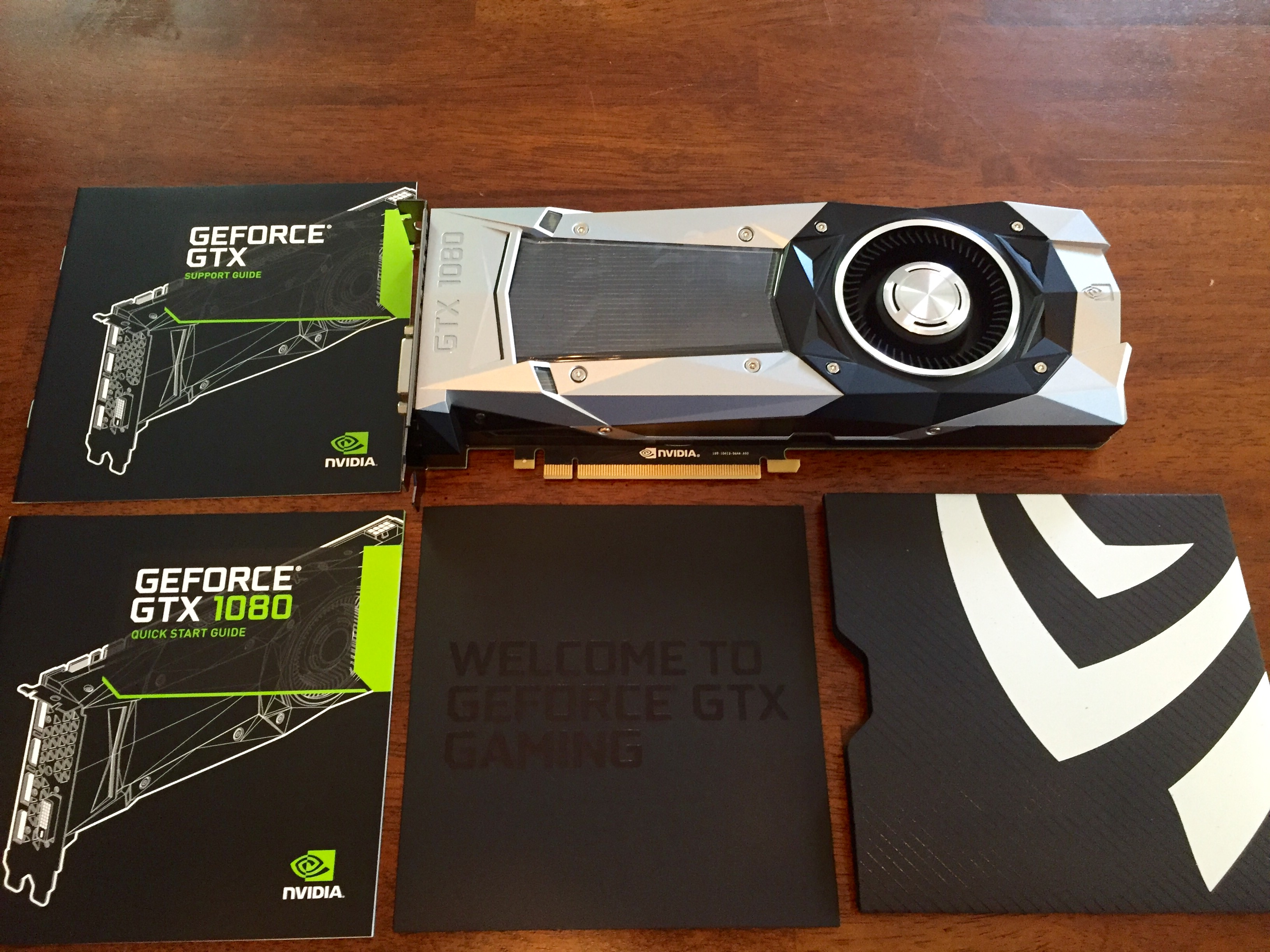
Geforce GTX 1080 (2016)

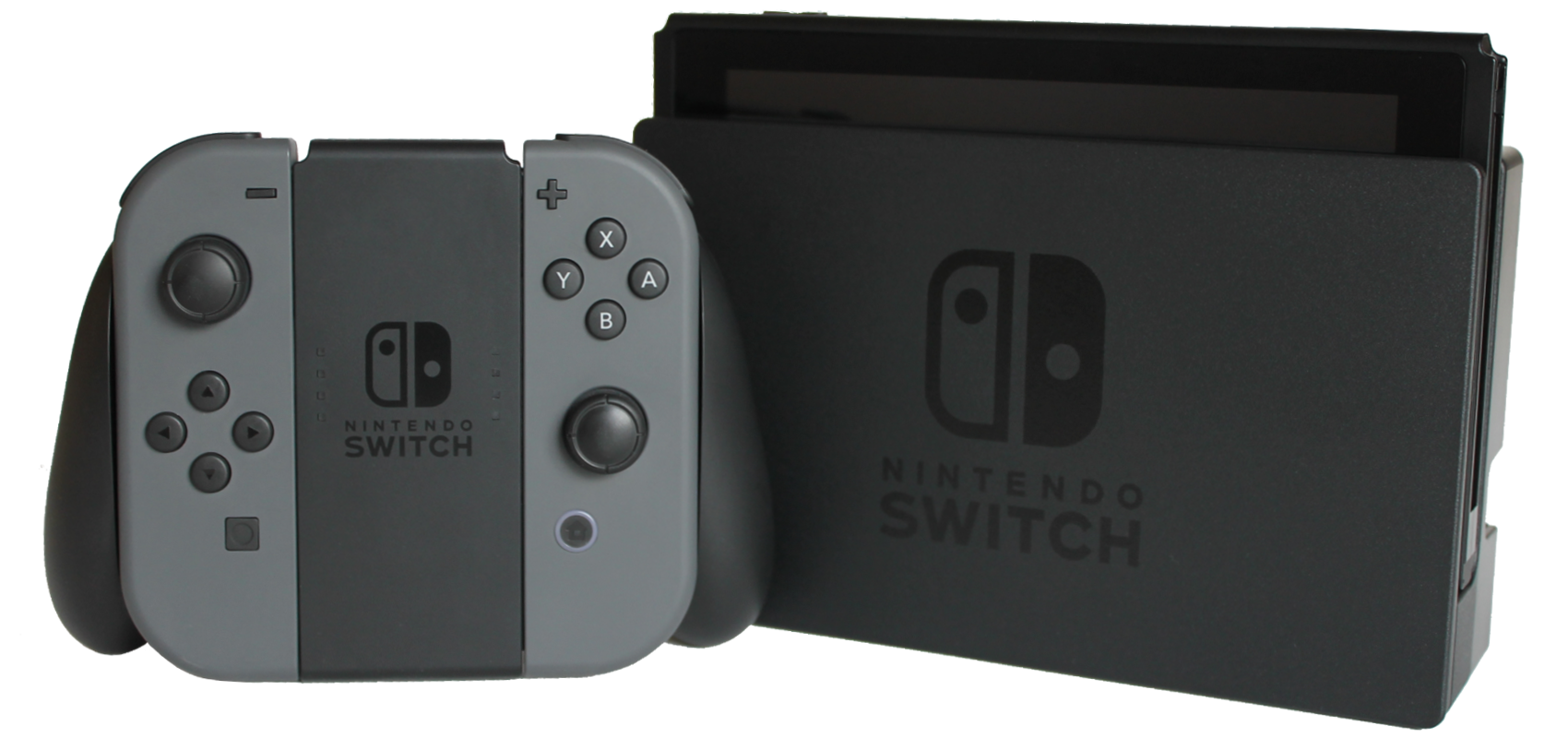
Nintendo Switch (2017)

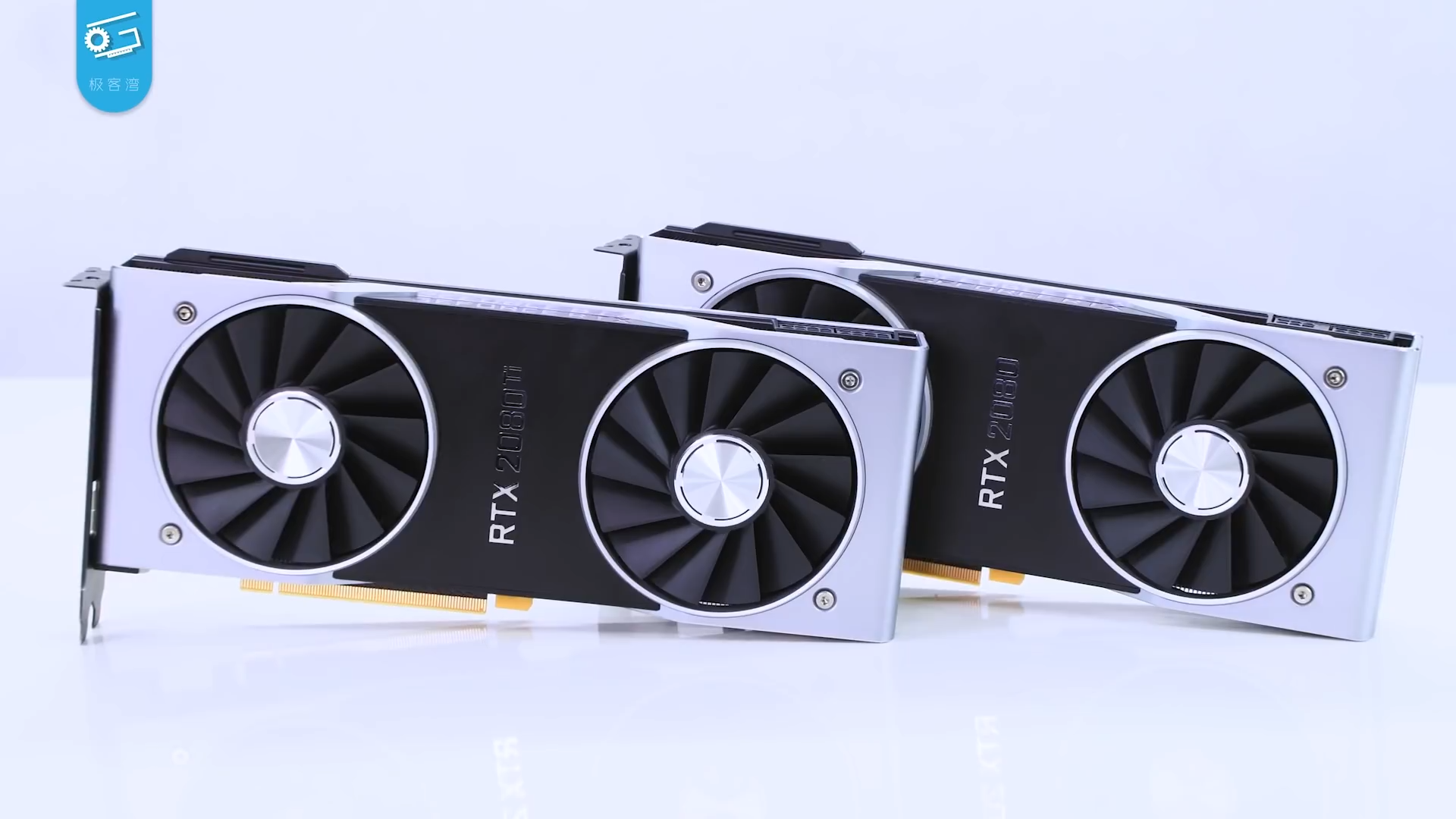
Geforce RTX 2080 (2018)

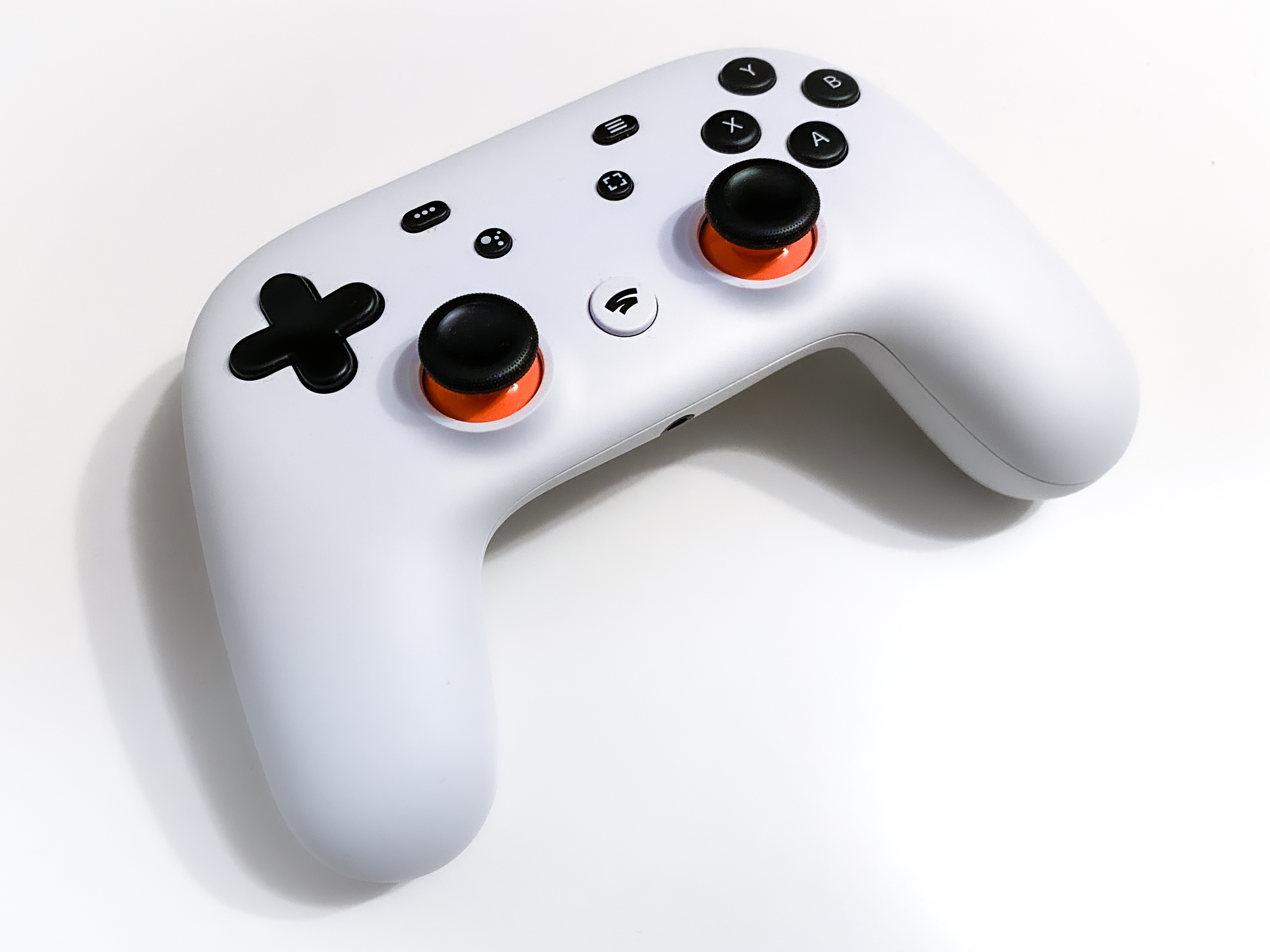
Google Stadia controller (2019)
