= Temple Run 2 =

2013 endless runner video game

- App icon
- Developer: Imangi Studios
- Publisher: Imangi Studios
- Series: Temple Run
- Engine: Unity
- Platforms: iOS, Android, Windows Phone, Tizen, Browser
- Release: iOS: WW: January 16, 2013; Android: WW: January 24, 2013; Windows Phone: WW: December 20, 2013; Tizen Phone: WW: October 14, 2016; Web Browser: WW: November, 19 2020
- Genre: Endless runner
- Mode: Single-player

Temple Run 2 is an endless runner video game developed and published by Imangi Studios. A sequel to Temple Run, the game was produced, designed and programmed by husband and wife team Keith Shepherd and Natalia Luckyanova, with art by Kiril Tchangov. It was released on the App Store on January 16, 2013, on Google Play on January 24, and on Windows Phone 8 on December 20. In November 2020 Imangi Studios released Temple Run 2 for the web on poki.com, a video game website from the Netherlands.

As of June 2014, Temple Run 2 and its predecessor have been downloaded over 1.5 billion times.

In January 2018, Temple Run 2 passed over 500 million downloads on the Google Play Store.

== Gameplay ==
Gameplay with Usain Bolt

Temple Run 2 features the same controls as its predecessor. However, the gameplay itself is slightly different insofar as it introduces new obstacles, such as zip-lines, mine tracks, sharper turns, waterfalls, and jets of fire. The game also features new power-ups, whose use is typically governed by an energy bar that is filled up by collecting coins. Should the character die from hitting any obstacles or falling off the path, the player will be given a brief period of time to save them and continue with green gems that are collected while running, or purchased online. The game is set in a different location than the first game, and the main character runs faster. The three monkeys that pursue the character in the original game have been replaced with a single large monkey called Shushank, who is the sole antagonist.

=== Playable characters ===
The initial release featured Guy Dangerous as the default character, with Scarlett Fox, Barry Bones and Karma Lee being unlockable. In early versions of the game, Scarlett Fox had to be purchased with coins. This requirement was later dropped in an update on April 20, 2022, in support of gender equality, allowing people to play as the character immediately upon downloading the game.

In August 2013, Usain Bolt was made available for purchase for a limited time, though this was later made permanent. In December, Santa Claus was made available for purchase, only for a limited time.

On September 9, 2014, the character Maria Selva was released as part of a promotion with National Geographic Kids books. In October, several National Football League players were made available for purchase for a limited time.

== Development and release ==
The development of Temple Run 2 began in March 2012. Imangi Studios stated that the main goal of the game was to make the gameplay similar and familiar to the original while introducing new elements and creating a "redeveloped experience." According to Keith Shepherd, "Our biggest reason for doing the sequel instead of an update is that we just weren't going to be able to make these changes to the original. Under the hood, the game was completely re-written from scratch and it's now in much better shape to allow us to continue adding more to it over time." Natalia Luckyanova added "Once it became so popular, there was a ton we wanted to do to Temple Run but it really wasn't built for expansion. It's built on top of our in-house 3D engine, which is pretty limited and requires a lot of coding on our end to make any changes. Plus, we didn't want to change Temple Run too dramatically, since so many people were playing it and loving it. So we decided to make a brand new version, where we could update the graphics, play around with powers, create new environments, etc."

Temple Run 2 was announced in a surprise announcement by Imangi Studios on January 16, 2013, with the game being released in the App Store in New Zealand immediately, and an international release coming a few hours later. The Android version was released on January 24, 2013. The Windows Phone 8 version was released on December 20, 2013, with the inclusion of Xbox Live achievements. A version for Tizen was released on October 13, 2016. Within four days of its iOS release, the game had reached twenty million downloads, six million of which were within the first twenty-four hours. As of 2018, Imangi Studios continues to develop Temple Run 2 and other games from their Raleigh, NC location.

== Sequel ==
A direct sequel titled Temple Run 3 was released for Android in October 2025.

== Reception ==
Reception

Aggregate score
Aggregator	Score
Metacritic	79/100

Review scores
Publication	Score
Edge	8/10
Eurogamer	7/10
Gamezebo	4/5
Pocket Gamer	3.5/5
TouchArcade	4.5/5
148Apps	4.5/5
AppSpy	4/5
Slide to Play	4/4

Temple Run 2 has been generally well received. The iOS version holds an aggregate meta score of 79 out of 100 on Metacritic based on 24 reviews, and a 6.7 user score based on 75 user ratings.

Edge were impressed, scoring the game 8 out of 10 and writing "Temple Run 2 is a beautiful looking, natural extension of the series that never breaks stride for a second." Chris Reed of Slide to Play was equally impressed, scoring the game 4 out of 4, and arguing that it "improves on just about every aspect of the original."

Carter Dobson of 148Apps scored the game 4.5 out of 5, writing "The sequel is largely just full of minor tweaks that mostly improve the experience while leaving the addictive core untampered [...] Playing Temple Run 2 is a simple reminder of why the original was such a hit, and why it stands above all imitators. Its mechanics are still pristine. Its controls are still pretty much immaculate. The formula has been tweaked, and I think it has come out for the better." TouchArcade's Jared Nelson also gave a score of 4.5 out of 5, writing "Temple Run 2's simplicity and intangible 'something' is what made its predecessor a game that I always went back to even in the face of a smorgasbord of alternatives, and it's what will keep this on my device easily within thumb's reach for a long time to come."

AppSpy's Andrew Nesvadba gave the game 4 out of 5, the same score he had given the original, writing "The end result is a smoother experience that retains the core of Temple Run without adding too much complexity so as to alienate its base." Gamezebo's Jim Squires also scored the game 4 out of 5, writing "There are no big shifts in gameplay. There are no buzzworthy changes. At best, you can sum it up as "it's like Temple Run, but a little bit better".

Eurogamer's Owen Faraday was slightly less enthusiastic, scoring the game 7 out of 10 and writing, "The biggest flaw Temple Run 2 betrays is its conservatism. The amount of work that has gone into the game is evident, and it's hard to fault an accessible, thrilling game that offers itself to you for free – but it's so similar to its predecessor that it ultimately feels a bit unnecessary." Pocket Gamer's Harry Slatter also scored the game 3.5 out of 5 stars, writing "Endless-runners haven't really moved on since Temple Run first sprinted onto the scene. And, if anything, Temple Run 2 highlights that more than most. Where Imangi was blazing a new trail with the first game and setting trends left, right, and right again, Temple Run 2 is just another enjoyable entrant into a crowded genre."

== See also ==
- List of most-downloaded Google Play applications
