= Temple Run =

2011 3D endless runner video game

- App icon
- Developer: Imangi Studios
- Publisher: Imangi Studios
- Artist: Kiril Tchangov
- Series: Temple Run
- Engine: Unity (Android and new versions)
- Platforms: iOS; Android; Arcade; Windows Phone
- Release: iOS: WW: August 4, 2011; Android: WW: March 27, 2012; Windows Phone: WW: March 27, 2013; Arcade: WW: November 2013
- Genre: Endless runner
- Mode: Single-player

Temple Run is a 2011 endless runner video game developed and published by Imangi Studios. The player controls an explorer who has obtained an ancient relic and runs from demonic monkey-like creatures chasing them. The game was initially released for iOS devices on August 4, 2011, and later ported to Android systems on March 27, 2012, and Windows Phone 8 on March 27, 2013.

The game was a commercial success with positive reviews from critics. It is regarded by critics as one of the greatest and most influential mobile games of all time. The success of the game led to a sequel, Temple Run 2. Collaborations with Disney/Pixar led to Temple Run: Brave and Temple Run: Oz, and a third spin-off in development by Scopely titled, Temple Run: Treasure Hunters as a match-three video game. Temple Run also received activity books and a board game. The success of the game also inspired multiple games that copy Temple Run's gameplay and branding.

== Gameplay ==
In Temple Run, the player steers the explorer across a maze, avoiding obstacles while also collecting coins, which fills up the coin meter on the top left of the screen. The top right displays the current score and beneath it the total number of coins collected in the run.

In Temple Run, the player controls either Guy Dangerous, an average explorer; Scarlett Fox, an escape artist; Barry Bones, a city police officer; Karma Lee, the fastest runner in the Far East; Montana Smith, the "second greatest explorer ever" (referring to Indiana Jones being the greatest explorer); Frost Pirate, a ghost pirate; Francisco Montoya, a Spanish conquistador; Wally Nutt, a Christmas nutcracker; Edgar Twiggenbottom, a scarecrow; Simone Davies, a Caribbean commodore; or Zack Wonder, a football star. The character chosen embarks on an adventure to seek an ancient and valuable golden idol from an Aztec temple, not realizing that the temple is inhabited by a family of demonic monkeys who want to devour them. As the game is an endless running game, there is no end to the temple; the player plays until the character collides into a large obstacle, falls into the water, or is overtaken by the monkeys, all resulting in a game over sooner or later.

While the character is running, the player can tilt their device left or right to move the character to either side of the screen to collect coins and/or avoid obstacles. If the player wishes to turn left or right, the touchscreen can be swiped in the corresponding direction. If the player wishes to jump over an object, the screen can be swiped upwards and if they wish to slide under an object, the screen can be swiped downwards. There are three types of coins to be found while the character is running: gold, red, and blue. A gold coin will only add one coin to the player's total number of coins. Red coins are worth two coins, while blue coins are worth three. The coins can be used to buy and then upgrade power-ups and/or other characters. Coins can also be bought by the player through in-app purchases with payments of actual money.

== Development ==
Temple Run was designed, programmed, and produced by husband-and-wife team Keith Shepherd and Natalia Luckyanova with art by Kiril Tchangov. The game took a total of four months to develop. Development began after the financial failure of Imangi Studios' previous game, Max Adventure and used that game to prototype Temple Run's controls. Imangi Studios wanted to make a quick game with simpler controls in contrast to Max Adventure's dual analog controls.

Keith started the prototype by making a game where the character is always running and can be controlled by rotating the environment from a top-down perspective. This idea was scrapped due to causing extreme dizziness during testing. To fix the problem, constraints were added so that players can only make 90° turns and perspective be fixed behind the character. When it came to the game's aesthetics, multiple ideas were conceptualized but ultimately settled for the character to running on a pathway resembling the Great Wall of China or Aztec temple.

After the temple design was solidified, Imangi Studios questioned the player character's motivation for constantly running without any breaks and came up with the idea of having something chasing him. Imangi Studios originally had the aliens from Max Adventure as placeholders. Kiril created the design of evil demon monkeys and gave them skull masks due to his desire of adding skulls in games he's involved in. Natalia initially did not like having evil demon monkeys chasing the player character and found them terrifying. Keith and Kiril, however, liked the evil demon monkeys and convinced Natalia to remain in the final product. Natalia later admitted that they were right and that it added immediacy and adrenaline.

The coin and gem mechanic was originally intended to be a variety of colored gems where the player would receive different bonuses depending on what combination of gems was obtained, similar to poker hand rankings but was proven too difficult to achieve and was scrapped. Natalia mentioned coins and Gems were particularly frustrating to add into the game that at one point were removed during development, but were added back due to the team missing them.

The Guinness World Record highest score for Temple Run was 67,702,984 points, achieved by "Thymufasa707" on July 10, 2013.

=== Release ===
The game was released on the App Store on August 4, 2011. The game was originally for 99 cents to download, but was switched to freemium prior to December 2011. After the release of its sequel Temple Run 2, the game renamed to Temple Run: Classic.

On January 12, 2012, Imangi Studios announced on the Temple Run Facebook page that the game would be released for the Android platform in February. The game was released on Google Play on March 27, a month later than expected. As Temple Run was originally released with an in-house engine on iOS, there were some difficulties when it was ported to Android, primarily related to the use of the Unity game engine. Initially, the game frequently crashed, occasionally caused devices to overheat, and drained battery life extremely quickly. This led to generally unfavorable reviews.

On March 27, 2013, the game was released for Windows Phone 8.

An arcade version was developed by Coastal Amusements and released in early November 2012, it was based on the iOS version. The arcade version was discontinued some time after.

Temple Run would then have an update for iOS and Android released in April 2018, which is based on the Android version and has a new splash screen.

== Related media ==
In November 2013, The Hollywood Reporter reported that Warner Bros. Pictures and producer David Heyman were in talks with Imangi Studios to make a movie version of Temple Run.

In July 2014, a Temple Run fiction series and an activity book was published by Egmont Publishing. The series is called Run For Your Life, with the first four titles called Jungle Trek, Doom Lagoon, Arctic Rescue and Pyramid Peril. The series is a "choose-your-own-ending" series aimed at fans of the game and books like Beast Quest. The activity book, Temple Run Downloaded is shaped like a tablet and includes Temple Run info, character profiles, mazes and brain teasers.

== Reception ==
=== Milestones and accolades ===
Since its initial release on the App Store, the popularity of the game has soared, to the point that Imangi Studios became more popular than Zynga. In the iTunes Store, the game was included in the top 50 most-downloaded apps in December 2011, and eventually became the number one free iOS app in the Store. It also reached the position of the top grossing iOS app. The Android version was downloaded one million times within three days of its release. By June 2014, Temple Run and its sequel were downloaded over 1 billion times.

Temple Run received an honorable mention for the Best Mobile Game category during the 14th annual Independent Games Festival, in 2012. Temple Run was voted as the Favorite App in the 2013 Kids' Choice Awards, and was also nominated for the same category a year later, which it lost to Despicable Me: Minion Rush. The Arcade version won the 2013 Best of Show Awards bronze medal for the "Videmption Arcade Games" category.

Award nominations for Temple Run
Year	Award	Category	Result	Ref
2013	Best of Show Awards	Videmption Arcade Games	Bronze	
2013	Kids' Choice Awards	Favorite App	Won	
2014	Kids' Choice Awards	Favorite App	Nominated	

=== Critical response ===
Reception

Aggregate score
Aggregator	Score
Metacritic	80/100

Review scores
Publication	Score
Gamezebo	5/5
IGN	7.5/10
Pocket Gamer	3.5/5
TouchArcade	4.5/5
148Apps	3/5
AppSpy	4/5
Slide to Play	4/4

Temple Run has been generally well-received amongst critics. The iOS version holds an aggregate score of 80 out of 100 on Metacritic based on 10 reviews. Phillip Levin of 148Apps praised the gameplay but criticizing the backgrounds; "my big qualm with Temple Run lies in the fact that the majority of the game's scenery looks the same. Yeah, the scenery does change here and there, but most of the time, gamers are running through ruined, temple pathways that look consistently the same. It all starts to blur together after a while." AppSpy's Andrew Nesvadba was more impressed, writing "Temple Run tightens up and polishes the endless-runner for the 3rd dimension, giving players a unique and fun challenge that controls like a dream." TouchArcade's Nissa Campbell praised its move away from the "one-button jumping control system" of most endless runners, as well as the game's milieu; "Any endless runner worth the name will give you high-tension situations and that "one more time" compulsion. But Temple Run is probably the only one that also makes you feel like a daring archaeologist with a penchant for deadly situations."

Gamezebo's Art Green called it "an instant iPhone classic," and writing "addictive doesn't even accurately describe the game. Enthralling gameplay as the game speeds up. Objectives add goals that keep you playing." Slide to Play's Andrew Webster praised the upgrade system, 3D graphics, and controls, concluding "Even if you think you're sick of automatic runners, Temple Run proves there's still much life left in the genre. It matches the sheer thrill and intensity of Canabalt, but with a completely new theme and perspective. We've all wanted to be Indiana Jones at some point, and now's your chance."

IGN's Justin Davis praised the game's depth and upgrade system, which he felt distinguished it from other endless runners, such as Canabalt and Robot Unicorn Attack. He concluded that "Temple Run is a fast and frenzied iPhone experience. The combination of swiping and tilt controls give each session a frantic feeling [...] Gamers craving a new iOS time waster should give Temple Run a long look."

PC Magazine's Laarni Almendrala Ragaza called the initial Android version "crisp", with "snappy" navigation. They also included it in their "Mobile Apps to keep Kids Happy" list.

== Legacy ==
=== Imitators ===
In the wake of Temple Run's success, other developers created games of a similar style, such as Temple Guns, Temple Jump, Piggy Run, Zombie Run and Pyramid Run. Imangi Studios co-founder Keith Shepherd found it flattering that developers were inspired by the game to create interesting games that make them unique. However, Shepard also found it frustrating when developers took exact gameplay, branding, and assets from their original game. This led to many of those games, including one from indie developer Anton Sinelnikov being removed from the App Store. The cost of imitating a full fledge temple run game on UNITY ranges between $10K to $90K.

=== Sequels and spin-offs ===
Temple Run was followed by several sequels and spin-offs, becoming the first game in the Temple Run series. The second entry in the series is Temple Run: Brave and is a spin-off based on the Pixar film, Brave. It was released on Android and iOS on June 14, 2012. The third entry in the series is Temple Run 2 and serves as the direct sequel to Temple Run. Temple Run 2 was released on iOS on January 16, 2013. The fourth entry is Temple Run: Oz and is the second spin-off in the series, now based on the film, Oz the Great and Powerful. Temple Run: Oz was released in early 2013. The fifth entry in the series is Temple Run VR and released for the Samsung Gear VR headset on December 23, 2014. After a seven-year absence, the series returned with a match-three spin-off, Temple Run: Puzzle Adventure, released exclusively for Apple Arcade on September 17, 2021. The sixth game in the series Temple Run: Idle Explorers was another spin-off, this time an idle game, also exclusive to Apple Arcade, released on June 6, 2023. Temple Run: Legends, returned to the endless runner genre, but with a simplified approach, taking inspiration from other endless runner games such as Subway Surfers. It released on Apple Arcade on August 1, 2024. A third main entry, Temple Run 3, was released in October 2025, exclusively for Android devices.

== See also ==
- List of most-downloaded Google Play applications
