= Imangi Studios =

American video game company

- Logo used since 2022
- Type: Private
- Industry: Video games
- Founded: 2008; 18 years ago
- Founder: Natalia Luckyanova, Keith Shepherd
- Headquarters: Raleigh, North Carolina, United States
- Area served: Worldwide
- Key people: Natalia Luckyanova, Keith Shepherd, Kiril Tchangov
- Products: Temple Run; Temple Run 2 Temple Run: Oz; Temple Run: Brave; Harbor Master; Max Adventure; Hippo High Drive; Little Red Sled
- Website: imangistudios.com

Imangi Studios is an American independent video game company best known for creating the free iOS, Android, and Windows Phone game Temple Run. Founded by husband-and-wife team Natalia Luckyanova and Keith Shepherd, the company also has an artist, Kiril Tchangov.

== Games developed ==
Games	Release date	Ref.
Imangi	July 29, 2008	
Imangi Word Square	November 9, 2008	
Little Red Sled	July 3, 2009	
Harbor Master	August 7, 2009	
Hippo High Dive	November 30, 2009	
geoSpark	December 4, 2009	
Max Adventure	December 4, 2010	
Temple Run	August 4, 2011	
Temple Run: Brave	June 14, 2012	
Temple Run 2	January 16, 2013	
Temple Run: Oz	February 27, 2013	
Temple Run VR	December 23, 2014	
Temple Run: Puzzle Adventure	September 17, 2021	
Temple Run: Idle Explorers	June 6, 2023	
Temple Run 3	November 7, 2025	

== Recognition ==
Pocket Gamer placed Imangi at rank #13 in their Top 50 Developers of 2013 list and rank #36 for Top 50 Developers of 2014. The New York Times reported that Imangi Studios had become more popular than Zynga.
