= Temple Run (series) =

Endless runner video game series

- Genre: Endless runner
- Developer: Imangi Studios
- Publisher: Imangi Studios
- Platforms: iOS, Android, Windows Phone, Tizen, PC, Mac, Arcade, Samsung Gear VR
- First release: Temple Run; August 4, 2011
- Latest release: Temple Run 3 October 2025

Temple Run is a video game franchise of 3D endless running video games developed and published by Imangi Studios. The primary theme of the series is an explorer chased from a group of demon monkeys, however, the characters and theme vary between spin-offs. The game was initially released for iOS devices on August 4, 2011, and later ported to Android systems on March 27, 2012 and Windows Phone 8 on March 27, 2013. The series consists of eight titles and has received commercial success with multiple entries surpassing 1 million downloads world wide.

== Gameplay ==
In the Temple Run series, the player controls a player character with the perspective behind the player character's back. While the character is running, the player can swipe left or right to move the character to either side of the screen to collect coins and avoid obstacles. The player can also swipe down to slide down towards the ground or swipe up to jump. If the path leads to a turn, the player must swipe toward the direction of the turn to successfully stay on the path. Intersections on the path allow the player to choose different paths. If the player does not avoid obstacles or doesn't turn to stay on the path, the player will fall off the path or die and lose. Throughout the path, there are coins to collect. There are three types of coins to be found while the character is running: gold, red, and blue. A gold coin will only add one coin to the player's total number of coins. Red coins are worth two coins, while blue coins are worth three. The coins can be used to buy and then upgrade power-ups and/or other characters. Coins can also be bought by the player through in-app purchases with payments of actual money. When the player needs to turn left or right, the touchscreen can be swiped in the corresponding direction. If the player wishes to jump over an object, the screen can be swiped upwards; if the player wishes to slide under an object, the screen can be swiped downwards.

== Games ==
Release timeline
2011	Temple Run
2012	Temple Run: Brave
2013	Temple Run 2
2013	Temple Run: Oz
2014	Temple Run VR
2015
2016
2017
2018
2019
2020
2021	Temple Run: Puzzle Adventure
2022
2023	Temple Run: Idle Explorers
2023	Temple Run+
2024	Temple Run: Legends
2025	Temple Run 3

=== Released ===
==== Temple Run ====
The first entry in the Temple Run series. It was released on August 4, 2011. The game was re-released on Apple Arcade as Temple Run+ on May 4, 2023.

==== Temple Run: Brave ====
In June 2012, it was announced that Imangi had teamed with Disney/Pixar to promote the 2012 animated film Brave via a Temple Run-style game titled Temple Run: Brave. The game was released on June 14 for iOS and Android. As with Temple Run when it was initially released, Temple Run: Brave cost 99 cents to purchase. Temple Run: Brave is set in the highlands of Scotland. The characters are King Fergus and Princess Merida, and as in the original game, the objective is to keep running, avoiding the dangers along the way in an effort to achieve the longest time possible, while being chased by the demon black bear, Mor'du.

The new feature for Temple Run: Brave is archery. During the run, archery symbols appear with some dots above them, acting as a signal that there will be bullseyes at which to shoot. The dots are the number of targets in the area. On the left and right sides, the player will then find archery targets, and by touching the screen, an arrow is shot accurately at the upcoming target. When the player finishes hitting all targets in the area, they get a coin bonus, and must then wait for another area with archery targets.

In an update, Temple Run: Brave received a new power-up, the "Will-o'-the-Wisps", which appear in the game random times during gameplay. When the player obtains it, they are transported to a "dark" version of the game world, where glowing wisps appear in the player's path. The player has to grab as many as they can, while still navigating the turns and jumps.

In 2013, Temple Run: Brave was ported to Windows Phone 8, and both Windows 8 and Windows RT (via Windows Store). In 2014, it was ported to BlackBerry 10.

==== Temple Run 2 ====
Direct sequel to the first Temple Run game. It was released on January 16, 2013.

==== Temple Run: Oz ====
A second spinoff game, called Temple Run: Oz, based on the Disney film Oz the Great and Powerful, was released on February 27, 2013, for iOS, to coincide with the release of the film. On August 28, 2013, Temple Run: Oz was released for Windows Phone 8.

==== Temple Run VR ====
Temple Run VR was announced in September 2014 for the Samsung Gear VR headset and released on December 23, 2014. This version the player is being chased by an arctic demon monkey in first person perspective. Players must avoid snow and jump over cliffs in order to survive. The game was ported to the Oculus Rift on May 1, 2015.

==== Temple Run: Puzzle Adventure ====
In late 2016, Scopely soft-launched a match-3 spin-off of Temple Run, titled Temple Run: Treasure Hunters, in select countries. Treasure Hunters was planned to be released sometime in 2017 on iOS and Android, with the Google Play Store accepting pre-registrations for the Android version. The game was eventually canceled. The game was brought back under the title Temple Run: Puzzle Adventure as an Apple Arcade exclusive on September 17, 2021.

==== Temple Run: Idle Explorers ====
Temple Run: Idle Explorers is an idle game released on June 6, 2023, in which the player can collect characters, earn gold and find treasures. On October 11, 2024, Temple Run: Idle Explorers was removed from the app store and was shut down on November 8, 2024.

==== Temple Run: Legends ====
Temple Run: Legends is the third Apple Arcade exclusive game, released on August 1, 2024. Unlike Puzzle Adventure and Idle Explorers, the game is much closer to the original Temple Run games, returning to the endless-runner gameplay style, although runs are not entirely endless as they end at certain points. A traditional endless mode unlocks after level 16. Unlike the original games, Legends is much closer to Subway Surfers in both gameplay and graphical styles. Instead of tilting your device to move in one open lane, the game features the three-lane structure that players swipe between that most endless runners have, with obstacles to jump over and slide under, although some levels include up to five lanes with additional side paths.

The game features ten playable characters, with some returning to the series and some new, each with their own unique character abilities.

==== Temple Run 3 ====
A third main entry in the series, titled Temple Run 3, was released in October 2025. The game acts as an enhanced remake of the original Temple Run, while retaing the gameplay style from Temple Run: Legends. Temple Run 3 was released with little announcement and was originally exclusively available on Android devices. In November 2025, the game became available on iOS devices in Indonesia, Philippines, Thailand, and Turkey.

== Reception ==
Aggregate review scores
Game	GameRankings	Metacritic
Temple Run	83.5%	80/100
Temple Run: Brave	75.0%	72/100
Temple Run 2	79.9%	79/100
Temple Run: Oz	67.5%	71/100
Temple Run VR	n/a	n/a

Since the initial release of Temple Run on the App Store, the popularity of the game has soared, to the point that Imangi Studios became more popular than Zynga. In the iTunes Store, the game was included in the top 50 most-downloaded apps in December 2011, and eventually became the number one free iOS app in the Store. It also reached the position of the top grossing iOS app. The Android version was downloaded one million times in under three days of its release. After Temple Run: Brave's release on the App Store, the game topped the charts as the most-downloaded paid game.

Within four days of Temple Run 2's iOS release, the game had reached twenty million downloads, six million of which were within the first twenty-four hours. As of June 2014, Temple Run and its sequel have been downloaded over 1 billion times.
