= List of Vietnamese inventions and discoveries =

This is a list of Vietnamese inventions and discoveries which includes technological, cultural and historical inventions. This list is incomplete.

== Academia ==
- Brieskorn–Phạm manifold: a term for a mathematical object defined as the intersection of a small sphere around the origin with a complex hypersurface with singularities, essentially creating a "knot-like" structure in higher dimensions. Brieskorn-Phạm manifolds are important in the study of topology, particularly in the field of exotic spheres, as they can provide examples of smooth manifolds that are topologically equivalent to a standard sphere but have different differential structures. The term was first introduced in 1966 and was further studied and perfected by Vietnamese mathematician Frédéric Phạm.
- Circular law conjecture in random matrix theory: a conjecture, established by Terence Tao and Vietnamese mathematician Vũ Hà Văn, asserts that for large random matrices with i.i.d. entries of zero mean and unit variance, the scaled eigenvalues asymptotically follow a uniform distribution over the unit disk in the complex plane, regardless of the specific distribution of the matrix entries.
- Inverse Littlewood-Offord theorem: a result in additive combinatorics that addresses the structure of sets that exhibit concentration of linear combinations of elements. It builds on the classical Littlewood-Offord theorem, which estimates the probability that a random sum of weighted vectors lands in a small region. The theory was developed by Vietnamese mathematician Vũ Hà Văn and Terence Tao.
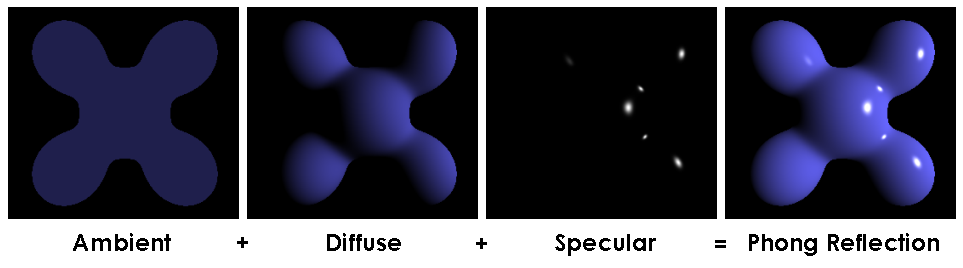
- Visual illustration of the Phong equation.
  Phong reflection model: an empirical model of the local illumination of points on a surface designed by the computer graphics researcher Bui Tuong Phong, who published it in his 1975 Ph.D. dissertation. It was published in conjunction with a method for interpolating the calculation for each individual pixel that is rasterized from a polygonal surface model; the interpolation technique is known as Phong shading, even when it is used with a reflection model other than Phong's. Phong's methods have proven popular due to their generally efficient use of computation time per rendered pixel.
- Phong shading algorithm: an interpolation technique for surface shading invented by computer graphics pioneer Bui Tuong Phong. Phong shading interpolates surface normals across rasterized polygons and computes pixel colors based on the interpolated normals and a reflection model.
- Proof of Brauer's height zero conjecture: a conjecture in modular representation theory of finite groups relating the degrees of the complex irreducible characters in a Brauer block and the structure of its defect groups. This notorious old problem, which has perplexed mathematicians for decades, was finally solved by Vietnamese mathematician Phạm Hữu Tiệp in a September 2024 paper.
- Proof of Fundamental lemma for automorphic forms: in the mathematical theory of automorphic forms, the fundamental lemma relates orbital integrals on a reductive group over a local field to stable orbital integrals on its endoscopic groups. The fundamental lemma, a problem that had been open for decades, was solved by Vietnamese mathematician Ngô Bảo Châu. His work earned him the Fields Medal in 2010, the most prestigious award in mathematics.
- Proof of Ore's conjecture: As the commutator subgroup is generated by commutators, a perfect group may contain elements that are products of commutators but not themselves commutators. Øystein Ore proved in 1951 that the alternating groups on five or more elements contained only commutators, and conjectured that this was so for all the finite non-abelian simple groups. Ore's conjecture was finally proven in 2008 by Vietnamese mathematician Phạm Hữu Tiệp and colleagues.
- Shamir conjecture in random graph theory: Vietnamese mathematician Vũ Hà Văn along with Johansson and Kahn solved the Shamir conjecture in random graph theory. Among others, they established the sharp threshold for the existence of a perfect matching in a random hypergraph.
- Solution to the Deligne-Lusztig Theory: a way of constructing linear representations of finite groups of Lie type using ℓ-adic cohomology with compact support, part of the foundational machinery of representation theory. Vietnamese mathematician Phạm Hữu Tiệp solved the problem in 2024. The breakthrough touches on traces, an important feature of a rectangular array known as a matrix. The trace of a matrix is the sum of its diagonal elements. The work is detailed in two papers. One was published in Inventiones mathematicae, the second in Annals of Mathematics.
- The Erdos-Folkman problem: Vietnamese mathematician Vũ Hà Văn solved the Erdos-Folkman problem in 2003, answering the following question in number theory: How dense should a set of positive integers be so that every sufficiently large integer can be represented as a subsum?

== Arts ==
- Tò He: a traditional toy for children made from glutinous rice powder in form of edible figurine such as animals, flowers or characters in folk stories.
- Vietnamese calligraphy: includes calligraphic works using a variety of scripts, including historical chữ Hán (Chinese characters), chữ Nôm (Vietnamese-derived characters), and the Latin-based Vietnamese alphabet. Historically, calligraphers used the former two scripts. However, due to the adoption of the Latin-based chữ Vietnamese alphabet, modern Vietnamese calligraphy also uses Latin script alongside chữ Hán Nôm.

== Entertainment & Theatre ==
- Cải lương: a form of modern folk opera that blends southern Vietnamese folk songs, classical music, hát tuồng (a classical theatre form based on Chinese opera), and modern spoken drama. It originated in Southern Vietnam in the early 20th century and blossomed in the 1930s as a theatre of the middle class during the country's French colonial period. Cải lương is now promoted as a national theatrical form. Unlike the other folk forms, it continued to prove popular with the masses as late as the 1970s and the 1980s, although it is now in decline.
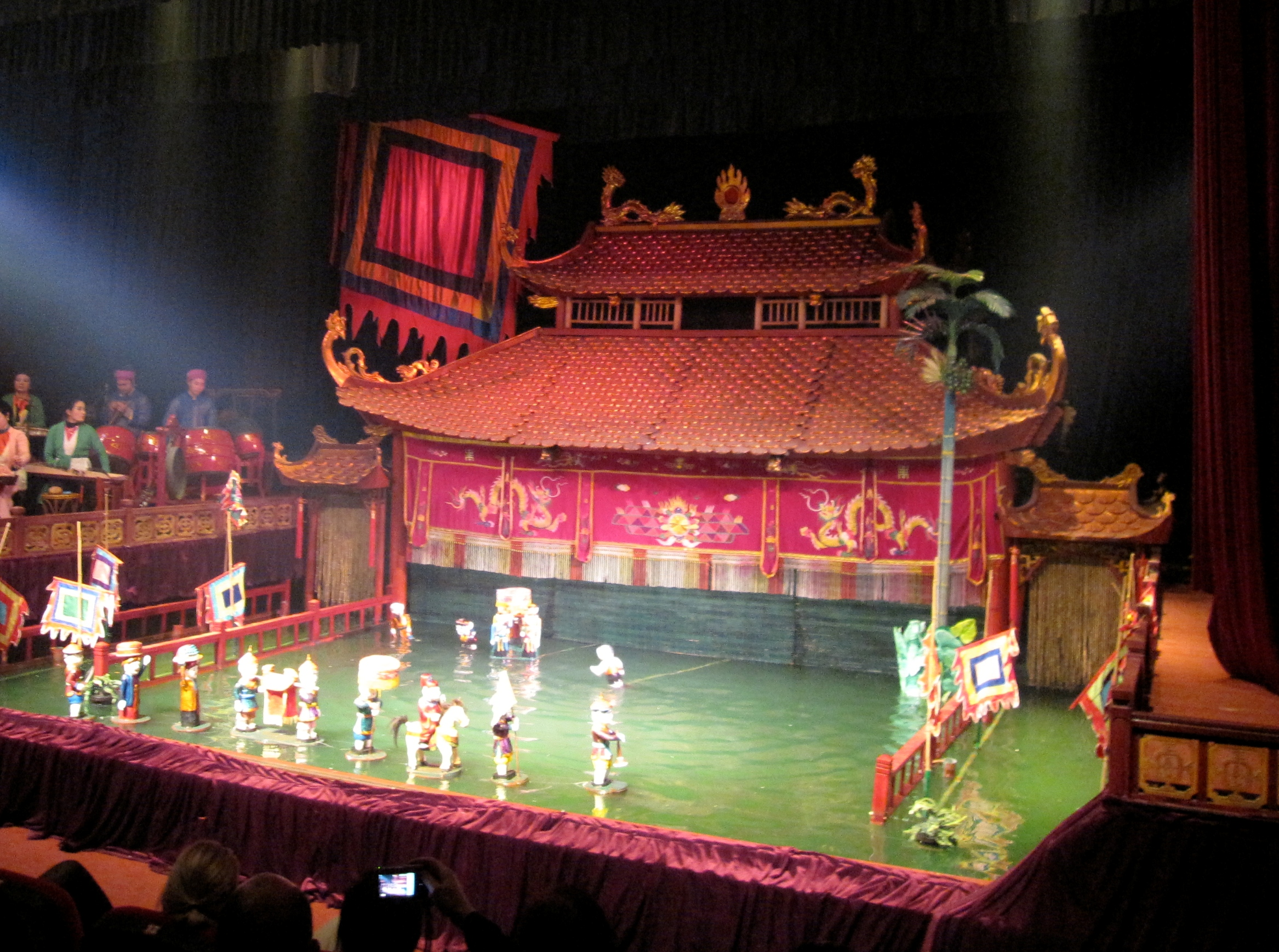
- A performance in the Thăng Long water puppet theatre in Hanoi.
  Chèo: a form of generally satirical musical theatre, often encompassing dance, traditionally performed by Vietnamese peasants in northern Vietnam. It is usually performed outdoors by semi-amateur touring groups, stereo-typically in a village square or the courtyard of a public building, although it is today increasingly also performed indoors and by professional performers. Chèo has been a popular art form of the Vietnamese people for many generations and has fostered the national spirit through its lyrical content.
- Tuồng a form of Vietnamese theatre. Hát tuồng is often referred to as classical "Vietnamese opera" influenced by Chinese opera. However, the first one to lay the foundation for the art of tuồng in Vietnam is Dao Duy Tu. Under the Nguyen dynasty which he served for, tuồng reached its highest point and was favored by Nguyen kings. Many great playwrights including Đào Tấn were also in this time.
- Water puppetry: (Vietnamese: Múa rối nước) a tradition that dates back as far as the 11th century, when it originated in the villages of the Red River Delta, in the north of the country. Vietnamese water puppetry is a variation on the ancient Asian puppet tradition.

== Language ==
- Chữ Nôm: (𡨸喃, IPA: [t͡ɕɨ˦ˀ˥ nom˧˧]) a logographic writing system formerly used to write the Vietnamese language. It uses Chinese characters (chữ Hán) to represent Sino-Vietnamese vocabulary and some native Vietnamese words, with other words represented by new characters created using a variety of methods, including phono-semantic compounds. This composite script was therefore highly complex and was accessible to less than five percent of the Vietnamese population who had mastered written Chinese.
- Vietnamese Language: an Austroasiatic language spoken primarily in Vietnam where it is the national and official language. Vietnamese is spoken natively by around 85 million people, several times as many as the rest of the Austroasiatic family combined. It is the native language of the Vietnamese (Kinh) people, as well as a second or first language for other ethnic groups in Vietnam, and still used by Vietnamese diaspora in the world. It belongs to the Vietic branch and is closest to the Mường language.

== Music and instruments ==
=== Folk music ===
- Ca Huế.
- Ca trù, an ancient Vietnamese music genre.
- Chầu văn.
- Nhạc tài tử.
- Quan họ.
- Vọng cổ.
- Xẩm.

=== Musical instruments ===
- Bro, a traditional musical instrument of the Bahnar, Sedang, Rhađe, Jarai, and Giẻ Xtiêng peoples of the Central Vietnam Highlands. It is a tube zither.
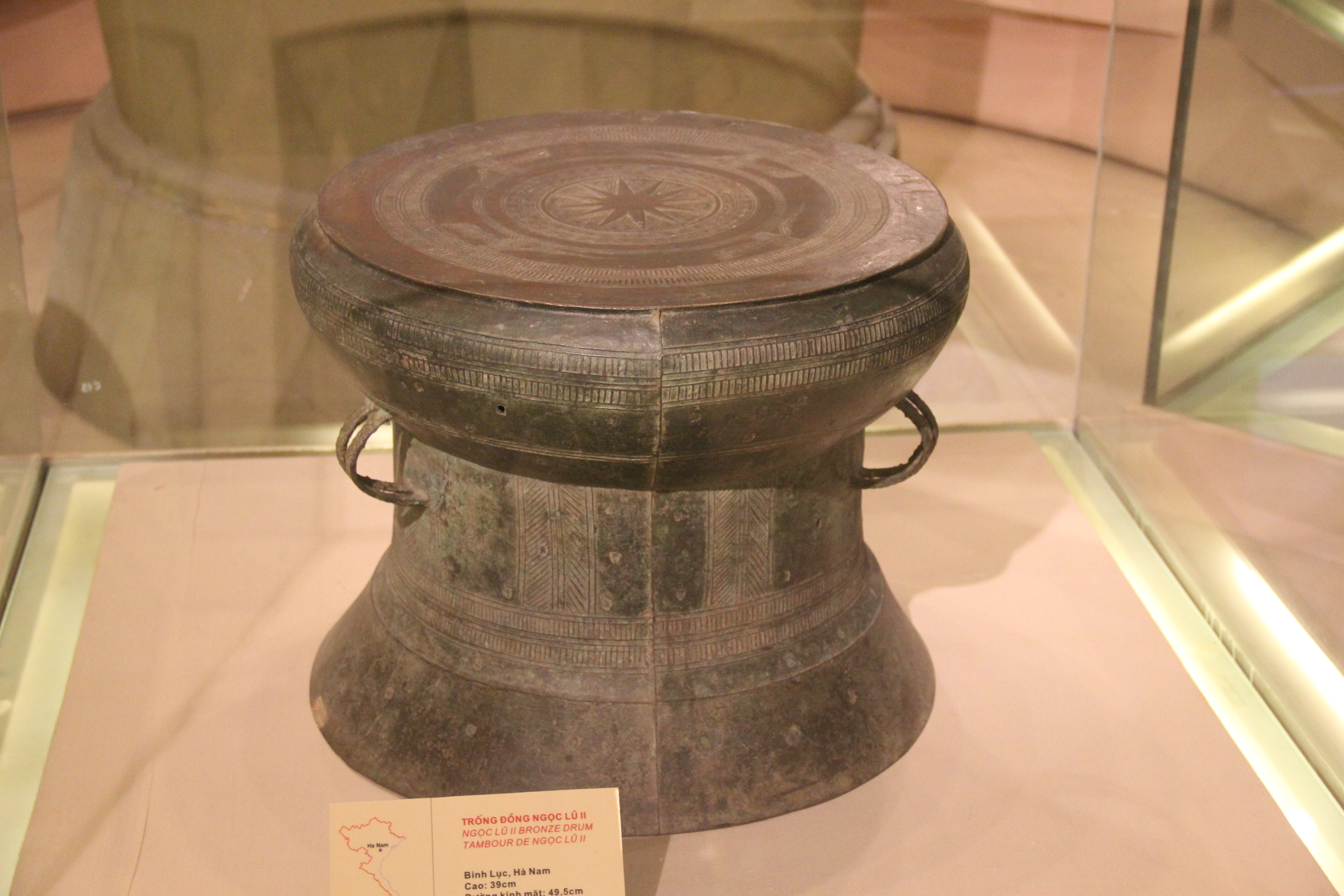
- Dong Son Bronze drum
  Bronze drum The Dong Son drum is an iconic artifact of ancient Vietnam from the Dong Son culture (roughly 7th century BCE to 1st century CE). Skillfully cast in bronze using the lost-wax technique, these large drums feature a distinctive tympanum decorated with geometric patterns, concentric circles, and motifs of birds, frogs, boats, and dancing figures. Beyond serving as musical instruments in rituals, they symbolized power, prosperity, and spiritual connection, acting as important status symbols for chieftains in early Vietnamese society.
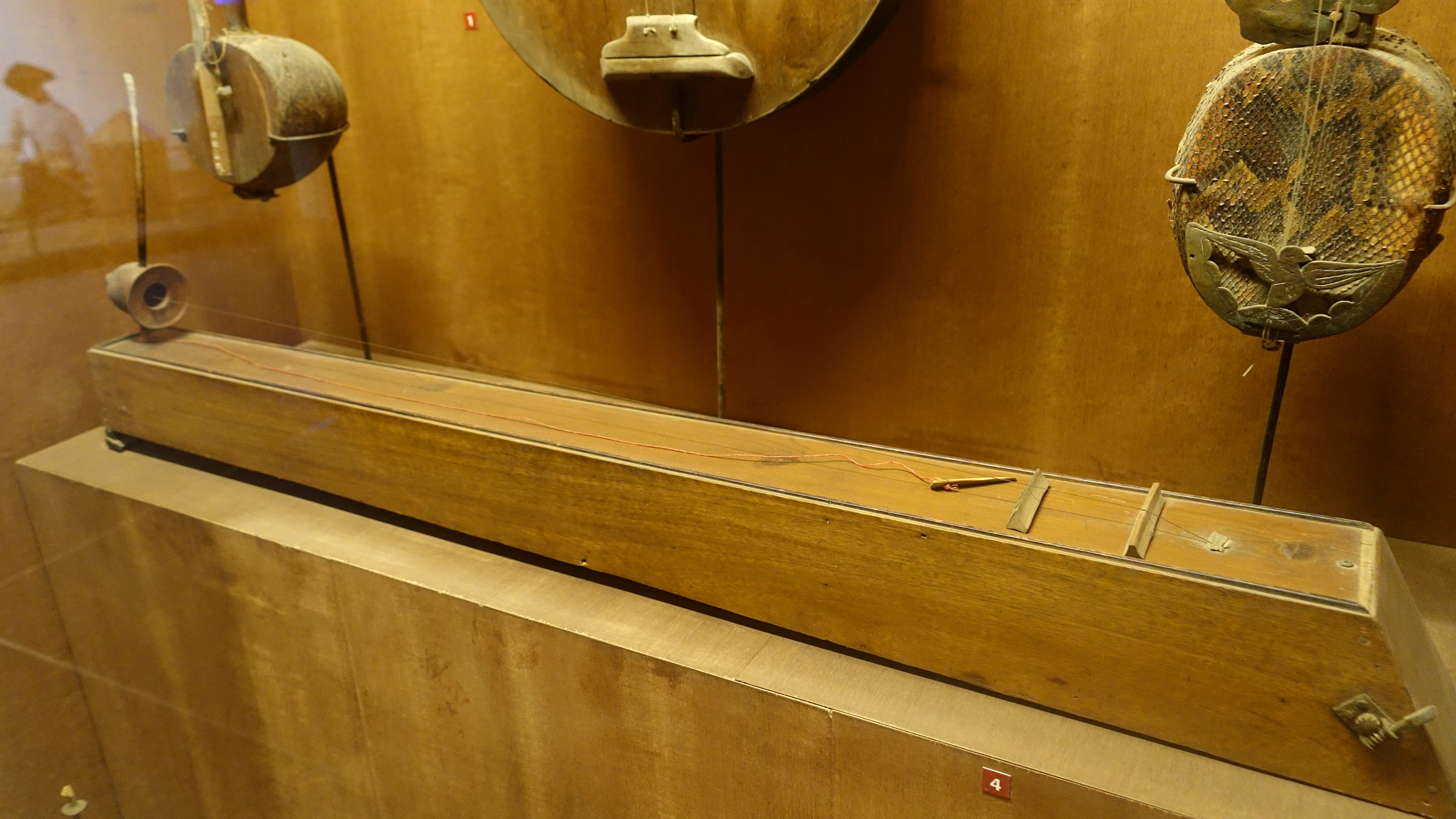
- Dan bau
  Đàn bầu a Vietnamese stringed instrument in the form of a monochord (one-string) zither.
- Đàn đá is a lithophone played by ethnic minority groups in the Central Highlands of Vietnam, in the provinces of Lâm Đồng, Đắk Nông, Đắk Lắk, Gia Lai, and Kon Tum. These provinces are also home of the space of Gong culture listed in UNESCO's World Heritage Site.
- Đàn đáy The đàn đáy dates back to the 15th century and became especially popular during the Mạc Dynasty. Its original name is “đàn không đáy” (literally “bottomless lute”), written in Chinese as 無題琴, because the instrument has no back or bottom.
- Đàn gáo.
- Gong.
- K'lông pút.
- K'ni.
- Phách.
- Sênh tiền.
- Song loan.
- T'rung.
- Trống cơm.

== Sports ==
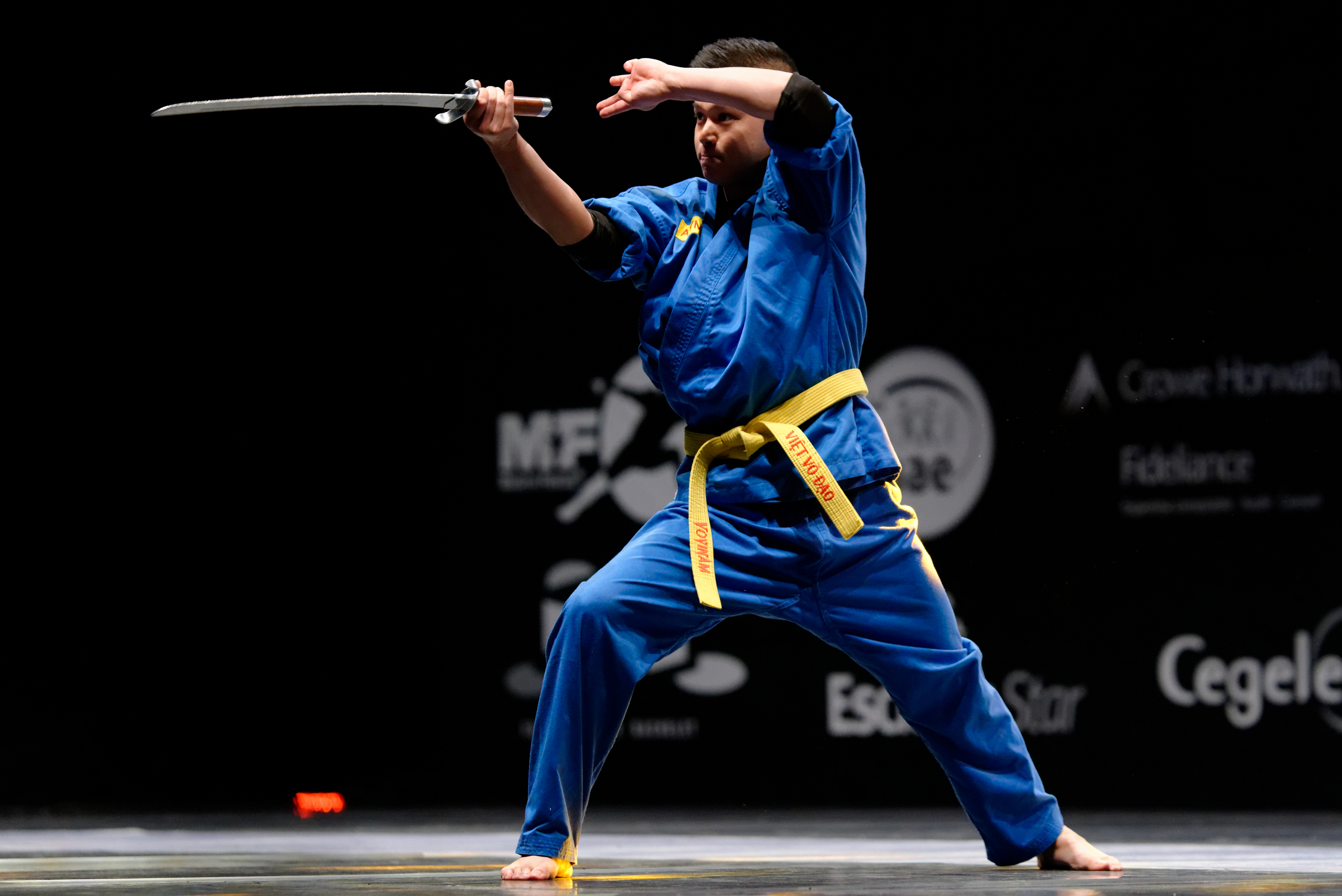
- Vovinam demonstration in France, 2014.
  Vovinam: a Vietnamese martial art founded by Nguyễn Lộc in 1938 with the intent of providing practitioners with an efficient method of self-defense after a short period of study. Nguyễn believed martial arts would contribute to freeing Vietnam from French colonial rule and from foreign invasions. Vovinam added elements of Chinese and Japanese systems to traditional Vietnamese martial arts systems, which were partially created as a response to the French occupation and to promote a sense of national identity for the Vietnamese people. Hence, it is similar to Korean taekwondo in that it is an eclectic system with combined elements of Japanese and Chinese martial arts within an indigenous framework.

== Technology ==
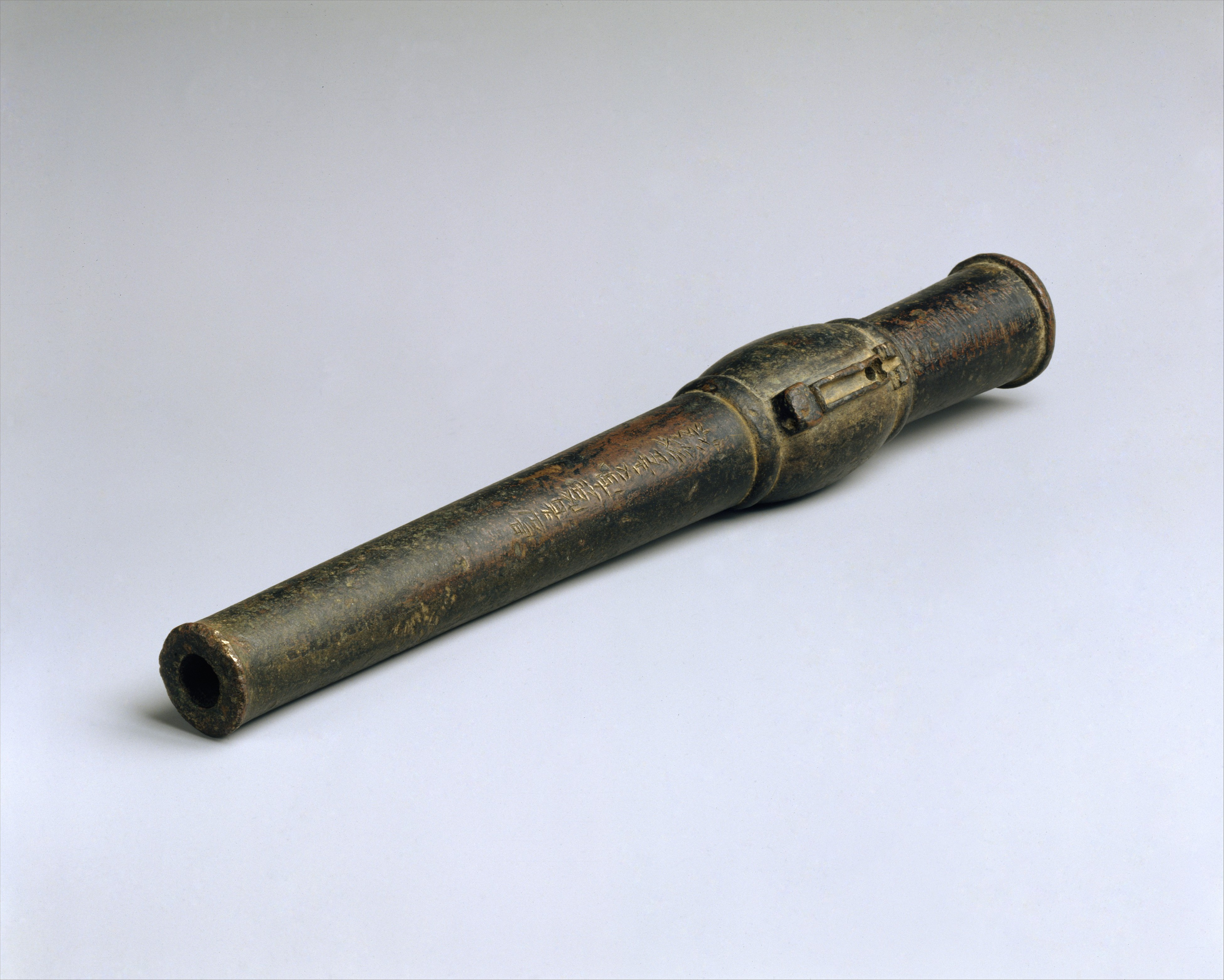
A Chinese handcannon dated to 1424 with the flash pan adopted from Vietnamese handcannons after the Ming invasion of Vietnam in 1407

- ATM: the co-inventor of the ATM is Vietnamese-born inventor Do Duc Cuong.
- Biological pest control: The first report of the use of an insect species to control an insect pest comes from "Nan Fang Cao Mu Zhuang" (南方草木狀 Plants of the Southern Regions) (c. 304 AD), attributed to Western Jin dynasty botanist Ji Han (嵇含, 263–307), in which it is mentioned that "Jiaozhi (modern Northern Vietnam) people sell ants and their nests attached to twigs looking like thin cotton envelopes, the reddish-yellow ant being larger than normal. Without such ants, southern citrus fruits will be severely insect-damaged". The ants used are known as huang gan (huang = yellow, gan = citrus) ants (Oecophylla smaragdina). The practice was later reported by Ling Biao Lu Yi (late Tang dynasty or Early Five Dynasties), in Ji Le Pian by Zhuang Jisu (Southern Song dynasty), in the Book of Tree Planting by Yu Zhen Mu (Ming dynasty), in the book Guangdong Xing Yu (17th century), Lingnan by Wu Zhen Fang (Qing dynasty), in Nanyue Miscellanies by Li Diao Yuan, and others.
- BKAV antivirus: a leading Vietnamese cybersecurity company known for its antivirus software, which has garnered international attention for protecting against malware and cyber threats.
- Bulkhead (partition): an upright wall within the hull of a ship. A twin-hulled boat unearthed in Bac Ninh, Vietnam, features a series of bulkheads along each hull, which help strengthen the structure. The boat is dated to about 1,600–1,800 years ago. If so, this would represent the earliest archaeological evidence of bulkheads found anywhere in the world to date.
- Champa rice: a quick-maturing, drought resistant rice that can allow two harvests of sixty days each per growing season, introduced from the Champa Kingdom into Song China in the 11th century.
- Copper sheathing: a method for protecting the hull of a wooden vessel from attack by shipworms, barnacles and other marine growth through the use of copper plates affixed to the surface of the hull, below the waterline. A number of Chinese sources attributed the origin of this technology to Northern Vietnam prior to the 4th century.
- Flash pan: a small receptacle for priming powder on gun barrels. The flash pan probably first appeared on Vietnamese handcannons prior to 1407.
- FPT Corporation: the largest information technology service company and AI provider in Vietnam. The company's smart cloud division developed one of the first AI virtual assistant for call centers, utilizing large language models (LLMs), natural language processing (NLP), automatic speech recognition (ASR), and text-to-speech (TTS).
- Habitify: a popular habit-tracking app that helps users form and maintain good habits. It provides statistics to help users track their progress and streaks. Founded by Vietnamese developer Peter Vu.
- KarmaCheck: a software company providing background checking, credentialing, and compliance solutions services using a streamlined, API-first platform. Founded by Vietnamese entrepreneur Eric Ly, who is currently the CEO.
- Leeboard: To avoid leeward drift caused by the force of wind in sailing, the leeboard was invented; it was a board lowered onto the side of the ship opposite to the direction of the wind, helping the ship to stay upright and afloat even if the hull was breached. British writers Paul Johnstone and Sean McGrail state that an odd-looking second paddle on a bronze drum of the Dong Son culture (centered in the Red River Delta of northern Vietnam) may depict a leeboard in use as early as 300 BC.
- LinkedIn: a business and employment-focused social media platform that works through websites and mobile apps. Co-founded in 2003 by Vietnamese entrepreneur Eric Ly, who also served as the founding CTO.
- Manscaped: a male grooming company selling high-quality products targeted at pubic hair removal. The company reached over a billion dollar valuation. Founded by Vietnamese entrepreneur Paul Tran, who is currently the CEO.
- NanoDragon: a satellite built by the Vietnam National Satellite Center. It was launched by the Epsilon launch vehicle on 9th November 2021 as part of the Innovative Satellite Technology Demonstration-2 mission.
- pdfTeX: a sophisticated computer program that is an extension of Knuth's typesetting program TeX. Developed by Vietnamese developer Hàn Thế Thành.
- Plum Village App: a popular, free mindfulness app with Buddhist insights and guided meditations offered by Vietnamese Zen Master Thích Nhất Hạnh and his monastic community.
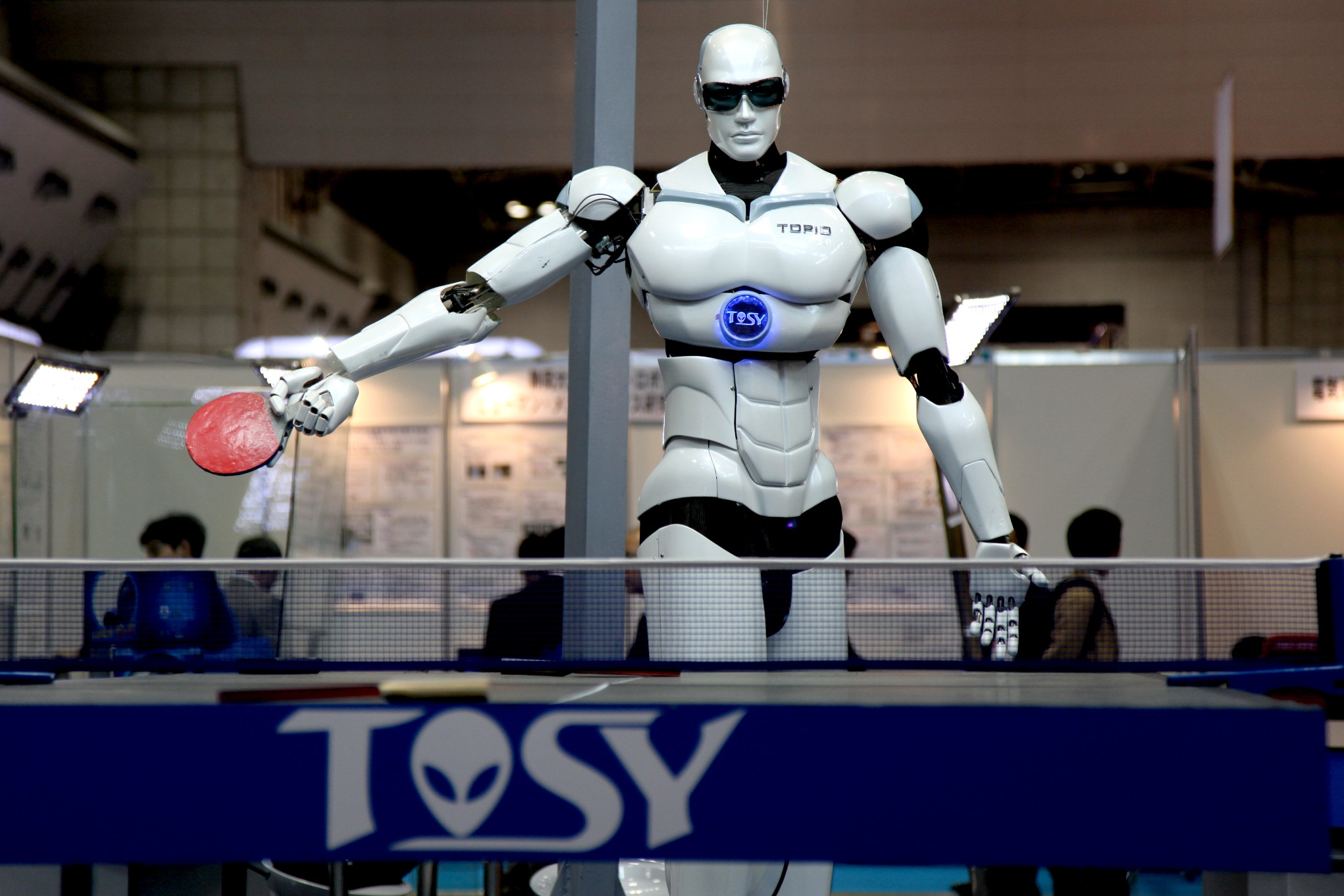
- A Vietnamese-made TOPIO 3.0 humanoid ping-pong-playing robot displayed during the 2009 International Robot Exhibition (IREX) in Tokyo.
  TOPIO robot: a bipedal humanoid robot designed to play table tennis against a human being, developed by Vietnamese robotics company TOSY.
- Viettel Group: one of the largest telecommunications companies in Vietnam. The company launched the world's first O-RAN 5G network. Their R&D in digital transformation has influenced telecom infrastructure development in several developing countries.
- Vinfast Electric Vehicles: Vietnam's first major automobile manufacturer to produce electric vehicles (EVs) for the international market. The company is pioneering the growth of EVs in Southeast Asia.
- VNG Corporation: Vietnam's first unicorn start-up and developer of Vietnam's most popular music streaming service, ZingMP3.
- VNI: a software company known for developing an encoding (VNI encoding) and a popular input method (VNI Input) for Vietnamese. Developed by Vietnamese computer programmer Hồ Thành Việt.
- Zalo: a Vietnamese instant messaging multi-platform service with over 200 million users. The app is also used in other countries outside of Vietnam, such as the US, Japan, South Korea, Australia, Germany, Myanmar and Singapore.

== Video Games ==
- Axie Infinity: an NFT-based blockchain game developed by Vietnamese developer Sky Mavis. The game was built on the Ronin network, an Ethereum-linked sidechain, and uses Ethereum-based cryptocurrencies for its in-game economy.
- Dancing Ballz: a mobile rhythm game developed by Vietnamese game developer Amanotes. The gameplay consists of tapping the screen, where players have to control avatar characters such as animals, insects, discs and balls through line trails, avoiding or jumping over obstacles guided by marked points.
- Flappy Bird: a casual mobile game developed by Vietnamese game artist and programmer Dong Nguyen (Vietnamese: Nguyễn Hà Đông) under his game development company .Gears.
- Magic Tiles 3: a music piano game created by Vietnamese developer Amanotes, the number one mobile music games publisher in the world. Players need to tap tiles in time with the music, all while avoiding the white tiles. It's a game of skill and reflexes that is very similar to Piano Tiles.
- Shadow Era: a free online digital collectible card game created by Vietnamese developer Wulven Studios. The game is supported on PC, iOS, and Android, and it was released on February 24, 2011.
- Swing Copters: an arcade video game developed by Vietnamese video game developer .Gears, best known for Flappy Bird. The player controls a character wearing a helmet with helicopter rotors, and the player changes the direction of the character by tapping the screen.
- Tam cúc: a multi-trick card game popular in North Vietnam that uses a deck of 32 Chinese chess cards divided into two suits: red and black.
- Tiles Hop: a mobile music game created by Vietnamese developer Amanotes. Players control a ball that jump to the rhythm of thrilling EDM songs between different color changing tiles while avoiding obstacles along the way. Since the launch in 2018, Tiles Hop has reached over a billion downloads and is consistently ranked #1 in music games.
- Tổ tôm: the origin of tổ tôm is still unclear, but by the 19th century in Vietnam, this card game was very popular, especially among the upper class who considered it an elegant game that required a lot of intelligence.
- 7554: Glorious Memories Revived: a first-person shooter video game developed by Vietnamese video game developer Emobi Games for Windows. It was released for Vietnamese markets on December 16, 2011.
