= Hypercasual game =

Video game genre

A hypercasual game is a video game (typically a mobile video game) which is easy-to-play and usually free-to-play; hypercasual games also feature very minimalistic user interfaces. Popularized in 2017 by game makers such as Kwalee, Ketchapp and Voodoo, these games can be quickly played after downloading, usually without any tutorial or instructions. They also often use a 2D design with a simple color scheme, easy mechanics adding to their simplicity. Usually featuring infinite looped mechanics, hypercasual games are playable for an infinite amount of time, leading to their addictive nature. Some argue hypercasual games are a business model, rather than a genre. These games are often played while multitasking, which is why their simple user interface is essential. Because of the lack of a robust in-game economy and free download cost of most hyper-causal games, revenue is mostly generated from ads.

Most of these ads come in the form of:

- Rewarded videos (when these ad videos are watched, the player is rewarded with extra time, extra lives, or other in-game rewards)
- Banner ads (ads that appear at the bottom of the user's screen)
- Interstitial ads (advertisements that show between sessions)

== History ==
Hypercasual games gained traction in 2017 in mobile gaming, but are often seen as a genre similar to the 1970s video games that lacked detailed design and gameplay. The first hypercasual game that gained wide popularity was Flappy Bird, which saw over 50 million downloads and generated around $50,000 a day in its prime. Since then, hypercasual games have dominated top-charts in multiple mobile game stores such as the Google Play Store and the App Store (iOS). According to the EEDAR, the majority of mobile video-game users play while multitasking, and because of their simplicity, hypercasual games have become increasingly popular among these users. In 2016, popular gaming company, Ubisoft, bought Ketchapp (one of the hypercasual gaming company pioneers). In 2017, Goldman Sachs invested $200 million in hypercasual gaming company Voodoo.

== Examples ==
- Flappy Bird
- Temple Run
- Fruit Ninja
- Dinosaur Game
- Block Blast!
- Paper.io
- Royal Match
- Kingshot
- Magic Tiles 3
- Temple Run 2
- Subway Surfers
- Candy Crush Saga
- 2048
- Cookie Clicker

== See also ==
- Yeah! You Want "Those Games," Right? So Here You Go! Now, Let's See You Clear Them!
