= TOPIO Dio =

Humanoid robot

The TOPIO Dio is a robot designed to serve in a restaurant or coffee shop, or as a cocktail bartender, which is manufactured by Vietnam-based company, Tosy. TOPIO Dio has a 3-wheel moving platform, 28 degrees of freedom and is operated remotely with a built-in camera and an obstacle detector. It is 125 cm high and weighs 45 kg.

== Development history ==
| Time | Place | Event | Notes |
|---|---|---|---|
| November, 2008 | TOSY Robotics JSC | TOPIO Dio project get started | |
| June, 2010 | AUTOMATICA 2010, Germany | Introduce the 1st version of TOPIO Dio | 28 degrees of freedom, 3 wheels platform |

== Specifications ==
| Specifications | TOPIO Dio |
|---|---|
| Height | 125 cm |
| Weight | 45 kg |
| Power Supply | battery, 48V 20AH |
| Actuator | Servo motor |
| Communication methods | Speaker, Microphone |
| Camera | 2 |
| Degrees of freedom | 28 |

== Technologies ==
- Remote control via wireless internet
- Integrate 3D vision via 2 cameras
- 3D operation space of robot defined by the controlling software
- Processes pre-defined images
- Detects obstacles by Ultrasonic Sensor
- Three-wheeled base with omnidirectional and balanced motion

== See also ==
- TOPIO
