= Bee Leader =

2012 video game

- Developer: Flightless
- Publisher: Flightless
- Platforms: iOS; Windows Phone; Android; macOS; Microsoft Windows
- Release: May 24, 2012

Bee Leader is a game about collecting the most nectar and turning it into honey before the sun sets. It was released by Flightless.

== Gameplay ==
A gameplay screenshot showing the player character bee sucking nectar from a sunflower

The goal of the game is to collect the most nectar and turn it into honey before the sun sets. This is done by collecting nectar from flowers or from dandelions suspended in the air. There are also obstacles to avoid and depend on the type of level the player selects (sharks and volcanos in island levels or birds and wasps in country levels). Helper bees are also scattered across the level. If the player brings back enough nectar they will be able to move on to the next level.

== Development ==
Bee Leader was published and developed by Flightless. Development of the game was halfway complete when Flightless relocated their headquarters from Wellington to Mount Maunganui in New Zealand and refocused efforts on making games instead of doing client work. Upon relocation, they focused their concentration on finishing Bee Leader. Apple noticed them and provided support.

== Reception ==
Reception

Aggregate score
Aggregator	Score
Metacritic	iOS: 83/100 (Note: Score based on 7 reviews.)

Review scores
Publication	Score
Gamezebo	4/5
Pocket Gamer	4/5
TouchArcade	4.5/5
AppSpy	4/5
Modojo	4.5/5

Bee Leader received "generally favorable" reviews according to review aggregator Metacritic.

Gamezebo gave the game 4 out of 5 stars praising its "gorgeous visuals", "incredibly addictive gameplay" and "clever level design" while criticizing the fact that the "controls are a little spastic".

The game was downloaded over 3 million times and was given a "Best of the App Store" reward. Despite this critical success, the developer found that the game did not monetize well, owing to a combination of the free-to-play market being relatively new and the game being designed as a "pay-once experience."

== Flappy Bee ==
A game titled Flappy Bee was added to the App Store, drawing criticism both for ripping off Flappy Bird after it was removed from the App Store and for stealing the app icon created for Bee Leader. A complaint was filed with Apple, though it took time for Apple to change the icon or remove the app over the issue.
