= Bhag Corona =

2020 browser-based video game

Bhag Corona is an online browser game created by independent developers Akram Tariq Khan and Anushree Warade, who are students at Xavier School of Management (XLRI). Players play as an animated version of Indian Prime Minister Narendra Modi, shooting down the COVID-19 virus using a sanitizer. The simplistic gameplay draws inspiration from the 2013 video game Flappy Bird. The game displays educational messages related to personal hygiene when the character misses the virus.

The game was developed during the 21-day lockdown announced in India on 25 March 2020. ShareChat, a regional social networking app, featured the game on their platform.

== See also ==
- COVID-19 pandemic in India
