= Ketchapp =

French mobile game developer

Ketchapp SARL
- Type: Subsidiary
- Industry: Video games
- Founded: 2014; 12 years ago
- Founders: Antoine Morcos; Michel Morcos
- Headquarters: Paris, France
- Area served: Worldwide
- Key people: Antoine Morcos (CEO); Michel Morcos (CEO); Christian Calderon (CRO)
- Parent: Ubisoft (2016–present)
- Website: www.ketchappgames.com

Ketchapp SARL is a French video game publisher based in Paris, specializing in the mobile games market. Founded in 2014 by brothers Antoine and Michel Morcos, the company first came into the public eye later that year, through its port of the open-source game 2048. Ketchapp has been accused of cloning popular casual games by other developers. When Ketchapp was acquired by Ubisoft in September 2016, the company had more than 700 million downloads across their portfolio of games.

== History ==
Ketchapp was founded by brothers Antoine and Michel Morcos in 2014 in Paris.

In March 2014, the company cloned Gabriele Cirulli's open-source puzzle game 2048 and published it as an iOS app, with advertising and in-app purchases. It eventually reached the top of the iOS App Store charts. Ketchapp became successful by adapting ideas from other popular apps, with many of its releases being variations on existing games, such as reworking the popular 2013 game Flappy Bird as Run Bird Run.

In February 2015, the company released the scrolling reaction game ZigZag, which was praised for not being a clone of an existing game, however, in April 2015, developer Mudloop accused Ketchapp that ZigZag was a version of their game, Zig Zag Boom, that was submitted to but rejected by Ketchapp, and published under a different title without credit. Mudloop later stated that they had learned that their submission of Zig Zag Boom to Ketchapp post-dated Ketchapp having a working version of ZigZag.

In 2016, Christian Calderon joined Ketchapp as chief revenue officer.

As of November 2017, Ketchapp has released 137 games, including Jelly Jump. On 27 September 2016, French video game publisher Ubisoft announced that they had acquired Ketchapp.

On 16 May 2017, Ketchapp released a fidget spinner-themed game, titled simply Fidget Spinner and developed by Estoty. The app received seven million downloads in the first two weeks after it was released, as a result of which Ketchapp set up a Fanfiber store to sell limited edition Ketchapp-branded fidget spinners.
