= RedBit games =

Italian video game developer

redBit games (also known as redBit) is an independent Italian video game manufacturer and developer based in Rome, Italy. The company is one of the most well-known independent software houses in Italy for developing games on both Android and iOS mobile platforms (smartphone and tablet). The company's games have collectively been downloaded over 70 million times thanks to the success of certain casual games such as Splashy Fish, adventure games such as Haunted Manor and Haunted Manor 2, and the puzzle game Jelly Juice.

redBit is also one of the leading Italian companies active in development of games on Facebook, and has been repeatedly recognized in Italian and international press for its development of the popular games Pocket Rush and Jelly Juice.

== History ==
Founded in Rome in 2013, redBit games began producing video games for the Apple market, achieving immediate success on the App Store with the release of its first title Haunted Manor - The Secret of the Lost Soul, which reached first in both free and paid gaming app store rankings. Later, the company began to develop games for Android devices, both for Google Play and Amazon.

== Games ==
=== Casual games ===
- Splashy Fish
- Jumpy Jack
- Cookie Clickers
- Cookie Clickers 2
- RedBit Escape
- Galaxy Wars
- Impossible Lines
- Tap Galaxy
- Epic Clicker
- Bouncing Slime

=== Racing games ===
- Pocket Rush
- Fury Roads Survivor

=== Adventure games ===
- Haunted Manor - The Secret of the Lost Soul
- Haunted Manor 2 - The Horror behind the Mystery

=== Puzzle games ===
- Jelly Juice (Facebook, iOS, Android)
- Stones & Sails (Facebook, iOS, Android)
