= SethBling =

American video game commentator and live streamer (born 1987)

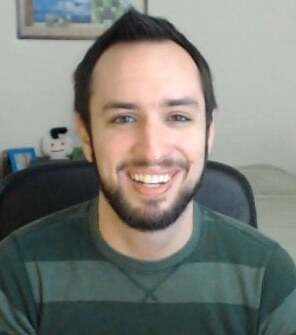
- SethBling in 2016
- Born: April 3, 1987 (age 39)
- Other name: Seth
- Education: California Institute of Technology (B.S. Computer Science)
- Occupations: Software engineer; speedrunner
- Employer: Self-employed

YouTube information
- Channel: SethBling
- Years active: 2011–present
- Genre: Let's Play
- Subscribers: 1.97 million
- Views: 645.4 million
- Last updated: April 15, 2026
- Website: sethbling.com

SethBling (born April 3, 1987) is an American video game commentator and Twitch video game live streamer known for YouTube videos focused around the 1990 side-scrolling platform video game Super Mario World and the 2011 sandbox video game Minecraft. He created original and derivative video games, devices and phenomena in Minecraft, without using Minecraft mods. He created an interpreter for the programming language BASIC and an emulator for the 1977 home video game console Atari 2600 in Minecraft. In addition to Minecraft builds that run without mods, he created plugins for the game.

SethBling wrote artificial intelligence programs that play Super Mario World, Super Mario Bros. and Super Mario Kart. He held a world record of 41.35 seconds for Super Mario World until June 2020, and a former world record for The Legend of Zelda: Breath of the Wild. He achieved the world record for Super Mario World by using a glitch that enabled him to execute arbitrary code and skip to the game's credits. In 2015, he was the first to do so on a home video game console. He injected code to play a Flappy Bird-like game within Super Mario World on a stock Super Nintendo Entertainment System. He was the first to perform this kind of arbitrary code execution by hand. In 2017, Cooper Harasyn and SethBling created a jailbreak by hand using exploits to save a hex editor onto a Super Mario World game cartridge, allowing for creation of mods.

== Early life ==
SethBling was raised Jewish, but has since become an atheist. He decided that he was an atheist sometime around when he was in elementary school, but "played along" through high school. SethBling's nickname is derived from his AIM screen name in high school.

SethBling started out programming his calculator in middle school and wrote "lots of" games throughout high school, including an MUD. SethBling wrote in 2012 that C# was his favorite programming language.

SethBling worked as a software engineer at Microsoft for three years, where he worked on Xbox, and for four months on Bing. SethBling said that his work at Xbox had not been related to video games, and that he had worked on the Xbox version of Internet Explorer, and on Xbox SmartGlass, a mobile phone app for remotely controlling an Xbox console.

=== Video games ===
SethBling played Super Mario Bros. 3 when he was five or six. Super Mario World was "one of the hot games" of his childhood.^{:67} SethBling had the Sega Genesis home video game console, and played a lot of Sonic the Hedgehog on it.^{:68}

SethBling started playing Minecraft around September 2010, after college, after his roommate told him about it. The sandbox aspect was "very appealing" to SethBling, as he played MUDs in middle school and high school. SethBling thought the game was "really cool" and played it for about a month, after which he was "done with this game". A few months later, he bought a new computer and decided to play Minecraft again. SethBling got into the technical community and was quick to discover redstone, a programmable resource in Minecraft, (Note: In Minecraft, command blocks store commands, unlimited in length and possibly nested, which make up a computer program when combined. For example, command blocks can perform operations on other blocks, teleport players and change the game mode. Command blocks are powered by redstone, a Minecraft resource which can form full-size primitive circuits on its own.) and began uploading videos of his creations to YouTube weeks later. SethBling was inspired to use redstone in Minecraft because he wanted to build a minecart station. Inspired by other YouTube videos about Minecraft, SethBling created his first few videos to "get [his] money's worth" from the screen recording utility Fraps he bought. SethBling initially uploaded videos on YouTube in order to share his creations on Reddit. He did not expect to gain subscribers as a small channel with only a few videos. SethBling's YouTube channel greatly increased in popularity when Minecraft creator Markus Persson shared one of SethBling's videos on Twitter.

My roommate was talking about it and I thought the idea of a completely moldable world was really cool. I actually played for several hours without looking at the wiki because I didn't want to spoil the game, and my roommate came home to see me huddling in a dirt castle. I hadn't figured out how to craft. Needless to say, I looked at the wiki shortly thereafter.

— SethBling, in Sam Gutelle, "SethBling Teaches Minecraft For A Living" (2013), YouTube Millionaires, Tubefilter

According to SethBling, he "almost never" played on consoles despite working at Xbox. Working at Microsoft, SethBling would spend almost all his free evenings and weekends playing Minecraft. SethBling quit his job at Microsoft around April 2012 because of his YouTube channel's success and has been independent since.^{:65}

== Minecraft career ==
Unless stated otherwise, all Minecraft builds mentioned in this section run on unmodded Minecraft, except modified block textures.

=== 2011–2012 ===
In 2011, SethBling recreated Duck Hunt using freshly introduced bow-charging mechanics in Minecraft. Engadget's Jordan Mallory wrote that SethBling's replica "[manages] to capture the innocence and nostalgia of our 8-bit youths".

In February 2012, SethBling recreated the 1964 toy Rock 'Em Sock 'Em Robots, which consists of a red and a blue robot, within Minecraft. Mike Fahey of Kotaku praised the mechanics and described the robots as "movable though somewhat janky".

In March 2012, FVDisco and SethBling created Super Pirate Battle Royale, a Minecraft minigame for two teams where the goal is to sink the other team's ship using TNT. Also in 2012, SethBling created SkyGrid, a Minecraft map consisting of blocks only on every fourth coordinate in each axis.

In September 2012, SethBling and survival map maker Hypixel, the creator of the popular server Hypixel, recreated gameplay, maps, and the eight player classes from the first-person shooter (FPS) Team Fortress 2, within Minecraft. Each player class has its own perks, and can be changed during the game. Minecraft creator Markus Persson called the recreations "the most fun and impressive" in a 2013 interview with CNET.

=== 2013–2014 ===
In February 2013, SethBling made a mechanical bull in Minecraft. Also in February, SethBling recreated the 1981 arcade game Donkey Kong and its introductory cutscene in Minecraft. In the original Donkey Kong, players have to avoid falling barrels, but in SethBling's version, they have to avoid minecarts. Three months later, SethBling created an air hockey minigame for two players in Minecraft. It consists of a rink and an endlessly sliding object made of many minecarts.

SethBling's minigames have been featured on Minecraft Realms. One of them is Blocks vs. Zombies, a 2013 co-op tower defense minigame in which players shoot arrows to defeat incoming zombies in a trench. As players gain killstreaks, they may purchase upgraded weapons, arrow-shooting towers, barriers and traps for zombies. The game ends when a zombie pushes another zombie over the front edge of the field. Julian Benson of PCGamesN said that the minigame takes the "stronghold mentality" of Plants vs. Zombies, the traps of Orcs Must Die!, and the upgrade system of the FPS Killing Floor.

SethBling recreated the incremental game Cookie Clicker, released earlier in 2013. In 2014, SethBling recreated the sandbox video game Goat Simulator and the puzzle game Bejeweled in Minecraft. (Note: More specifically, SethBling wrote a Bukkit plugin called BlingJeweled, which is a portmanteau.) SethBling also recreated a spinning Stargate, a moving sand wave and the Microsoft Office assistant Clippy. In early 2014, SethBling wrote a pickpocketing plugin for Bukkit called BlingPickpocket. In May 2014, SethBling created a Minecraft portal which renders a portion of the other dimension behind it.

In late 2014, SethBling and Minecraft YouTuber Cubehamster created a minigame called Missile Wars where players from two teams spawn missiles to break through the opposite team's wall. The idea came from having a fight between two Cubehamster's Mega Gargantuas, giant robots with cannons and "missile launchers". The robots could shoot flame arrows, launch TNT blocks and shoot down incoming missiles. After the Mega Gargantua fight, Cubehamster wanted them to "turn [it] into a game which focuses on firing missiles at each other and trying to blow them up". In Missile Wars, players receive items which they can use to spawn missiles, and blow up, stop and defuse incoming missiles. Players can jump on missiles and ride them across the playfield. Cubehamster said that "subtle techniques" involving missile mechanics had made the game popular. According to Cubehamster, Missile Wars was built in two weeks and thoroughly tested afterwards. The game was featured on Minecraft Realms.

As a nod to Microsoft's 2014 acquisition of Mojang, SethBling recreated basic functionality of Minecraft in Microsoft Excel, which included navigation and crafting.

=== 2015–2016 ===
A match being played of SethBling's recreation of Splatoon within Minecraft

In 2015, SethBling created a Minecraft version of Splatoon's Turf Wars mode. The Splatoon minigame is similar to the Wii U game, in that two teams of up to four players compete to paint as much of the ground and walls as possible in three minutes. SethBling got help from PyroPuncher because he had never played Splatoon on console. The Minecraft version features three of Splatoon's main weapons.

In 2015, SethBling worked with Verizon to create a web browser and to introduce text messaging and video calling functionality to Minecraft.

In 2016, SethBling made an interpreter for the programming language BASIC in Minecraft. Programming many Minecraft command blocks to run the interpreter took him two weeks. The interpreter is slow and its speed declines with continued use; that is because Minecraft has a clock rate of 20 ticks per second. For example, printing a single character with the interpreter takes 20 seconds. The build features a virtual keyboard; a whiteboard, which displays the code; and a programmable turtle, which can mine and place blocks.

In late 2016, SethBling built an emulator for the 1977 home video game console, Atari 2600, in Minecraft. The emulator has 64 kB of functional random-access memory (RAM) which can be edited on the fly, and a functional 8-bit microprocessor based on the MOS Technology 6502; it also has functional and importable read-only memory (ROM). SethBling had the emulator run the original Atari 2600 read-only memory cartridges for the games Space Invaders, Pac-Man, and Donkey Kong. The ROM cartridge contains four kilobytes of data; each bit of RAM and ROM is represented by a Minecraft block. More than two thousand command blocks comprise the emulator's processor. The emulator is slow: the Assembly-based processor can complete only 20 instructions per second; in contrast, Atari's processor can execute 510,000 instructions per second (0.51 MIPS). While the Atari 2600 renders graphics at 60 frames per second, SethBling's emulator renders graphics at 60 frames every four hours on a virtual screen. The emulator does not have a controller, so games cannot be played on it.

SethBling created a resource pack for Minecraft Pocket Edition Alpha, which was released in October 2016. The "Add-On" was titled Castle Siege Battle and was criticized by Kotaku's Robert Gurthrie for causing glitches.

=== 2018–present ===
In January 2019, SethBling sped up the Atari 2600 emulator to a rendering speed of one frame per second. It then took him around fifteen minutes to "technically" tie the world record of 5.57 seconds for the racing video game Dragster.

In 2023, SethBling replied to a reddit user asking what he was up to, saying he mostly works on personal projects but not anything that would make for good video content, along with learning node.js.

== Super Mario career ==
=== Speedrunning ===
Until June 2020, SethBling held the world record of 41.35 seconds for the Credits Warp Any% speedrun category of Super Mario World. Players can use glitches to modify the game's RAM values, allowing them to write assembly code. When executed via arbitrary code execution, the code allows players to skip directly from the first level to the credits without having to defeat the game's boss. In 2015, SethBling was the first to execute the Credits Warp glitch on a home video game console, with a time of five minutes and 59 seconds, after Twitch streamer JeffW356 had successfully executed the glitch on an emulator. SethBling executed the glitch for the first time on console minutes after a Super Mario World world record was set without using arbitrary code execution. By successfully executing the glitch on a Super NES console, SethBling validated the faster, emulator run by JeffW356. SethBling used four controllers via two Super Multitap devices to finish the game in under one minute. He left specific buttons on the controllers pushed down to manipulate memory bytes and write certain code. In the game, SethBling executed certain actions and pixel-precise moves like duplicating Yoshi blocks and launching a red shell at a specific pixel.

SethBling holds a former world record for The Legend of Zelda: Breath of the Wild without use of in-game unlockable bonuses enabled by Amiibo figurines, saying in 2017 that using the unlockables is "seen by casual audience members as 'cheating', but they also currently don't affect the run that much." In 2017, SethBling told Kotaku, "When I touch a game, I want to understand it."

=== Neural networks ===
In June 2015, SethBling wrote an artificial intelligence (AI) program called MarI/O that plays Super Mario World. The program is based on neuroevolution of augmenting topologies; thus, it generates neural networks using genetic algorithms. MarI/O is only given the level layout and the positions of obstacles, and is incentivized to emulate the fitness function moving as far to the right as possible, and as fast as possible. MarI/O tries 300 genomes per evolutionary generation, separated into species. Each genome produces a neural network, and only the most fit genomes are bred into the next generation. SethBling ran the program, and after 34 generations, which lasted 24 hours, MarI/O finished a level by spin-jumping through the entire level and avoiding all power-ups and enemies. MarI/O displays a graphical rendering of its underlying structure. A week later SethBling trained MarI/O to play Super Mario Bros. The program was not able to complete the first level of Super Mario Bros. because of complicated spatial movements required to jump over obstacles. MarI/O continuously played Super Mario Bros. for over 17 days.

In November 2017, SethBling built a recurrent neural network to play Super Mario Kart. He trained the program, MariFlow, with video footage in which he plays Super Mario Kart so that the program learns how to recover from dead-end situations. The video footage used for training MariFlow contains interactive sessions in which SethBling occasionally takes control of the character. MariFlow's goal is to emulate the video footage as closely as possible during gameplay.

=== Other ventures ===
In Flappy Bird, the player controls a bird which has to jump between vertically aligned pipes. Here, SethBling controls Mario, and the number of pipes he has passed through successfully is displayed in the upper-left corner. The pipe texture is from Super Mario World and Mario's animation is the swimming animation from the game.

In March 2016, SethBling injected Flappy Bird-like code written by p4plus2 into unmodified Super Mario World RAM on a stock Super Nintendo Entertainment System with a stock cartridge, in under an hour. SethBling first extended the level timer and used a power-up incrementation glitch to allow external code to run. He added code to display Mario's x-coordinate which acted as memory locations in the code he was writing. SethBling then created a bootloader to be able to launch the Flappy Bird-like code that he would later write into unused memory with precise Mario movements and spin-jumping. SethBling used two Super Multitap devices in order to use multiple controllers, which had several buttons pressed down. The arbitrary code execution setup that SethBling used was discovered by MrCheeze. Super Mario World had been modified to emulate other games before by automatically feeding pre-recorded controller input into the console via a computer, but SethBling was the first to do it exclusively by hand.

SethBling and Cooper Harasyn placed a full hex editor and gameplay mods onto a stock Super Mario World cartridge in May 2017, only using standard controller inputs. Harasyn discovered an exploit that lets a player write data to 256-byte save files that are permanently stored on a Super Mario World cartridge. The data can be arranged so that the game is jailbroken every time it starts up. Harasyn and SethBling used the exploit to create a compact, on-screen hex editor, loadable from a save file. (Note: The hex editor was first installed on a Super Mario World cartridge save file. It was then copied to a backup cartridge by exploiting the persistence of portions of RAM between system resets.) A player can edit the system RAM through the hex editor to alter the game state. In-game mods, such as support for the Super NES Mouse and giving Mario telekinesis powers, can be written to a save file using the hex editor.

On December 5, 2015, SethBling acted as a coach in "Clash of Karts: Mario Kart 8", a one-hour eSports special on Disney XD.

== See also ==
- ROM hacking
- Speedrunning
- Minecraft
