= Splashy Fish =

2014 video game

- Developer: redBit games
- Platforms: iOS, Android, Windows Mobile
- Release: 2014
- Genre: Flappy Bird clone

Splashy Fish is a 2014 mobile game for Apple iOS, Android and Windows Mobile developed by redBit games. The object of Splashy Fish is for a fish controlled by the player to swim through as many obstacles as possible without falling to the bottom of the sea. The game was inspired by Flappy Bird, with improvements to features suggested by the developer's sons.

== Origin ==
Splashy Fish was released in the wake of the take down of Flappy Bird. Massimo Guareschi of redBit said he created the game using a commercial app development system in three days. Within fifteen hours of its launch, the game reached the top of the iTunes free download list. The fish controlled by the player is loosely based on the Cheep Cheep from the Super Mario series.
