= Swing Copters =

2014 video game

- App icon
- Developer: .Gears
- Publisher: .Gears
- Designer: Nguyễn Hà Đông
- Platforms: Android, iOS, Windows Phone
- Release: WW: August 21, 2014
- Genre: Action
- Mode: Single-player

Swing Copters is an action video game released for iOS and Android on August 21, 2014. It was developed by Vietnamese video game developer .Gears, best known for Flappy Bird (2013). The player controls a character wearing a helmet with helicopter rotors, and the player changes the direction of the character by tapping the screen.

== Gameplay ==
A game in progress

The easy-to-learn-but-hard-to-master gameplay consists of the player's tapping the screen to change the direction of the character. The game has a comparable high score system and is similar to Flappy Bird, but it is even more difficult to control the rapid, horizontal movements of the protagonist. If a player touches an obstacle, the game is over.

== Reception ==
Swing Copters received generally "mixed or average" reviews, holding a Metacritic score of 56/100.

== Legacy ==
A sequel, Swing Copters 2, was released worldwide on December 16, 2015.
