= Dancing Ballz =

2017 mobile rhythm game

- Dancing Ballz: Magic Dance Line Tiles Game icon
- Developer: Amanotes Pte. Ltd.
- Publisher: Amanotes Pte. Ltd.
- Engine: Unity
- Platforms: Android, iOS
- Release: June 15, 2017
- Genres: Rhythm game, music
- Mode: Single-player

Dancing Ballz is a mobile rhythm game developed by Vietnamese video game developer Amanotes Pte. Ltd. It was released on June 15, 2017 under the name Dancing Ballz: Color Line and became available on iPad and iOS in August 2017. The game was replaced by its remastered sequel called Dancing Ballz: Magic Dance Line Tiles Game, released on September 12, 2017. A spin-off titled Dancing Ballz: Magic Beat was released on September 21, 2020. Magic Beat achieved overall rating of 4.5/5 in iOS store.

== Gameplay ==
The gameplay consists of tapping the screen, where player have to control avatar characters such as animals, insects, disc and balls through line trail, avoiding or jumping obstacles guided by marked points. With up to 46 levels in Color Line, 52 in Magic Dance Line Tiles Game, Dancing Ballz features EDM, dubstep, house, electro, rock, EDM trap, Christmas, indie pop and rock, and folk genres as well as popular songs such as TheFatRat's "Unity", "The Calling", "No No No" and "Monody", Sia's "Chandelier" and OneRepublic's "Counting Stars" added in Magic Dance Line Tiles Game. Stars and percentages are used to denote player's progress to destination, as from the latter one is useful for revival after failure, which can be done at least 30%. Good track yields players for acquiring more scores and also able to unlock characters. There are five regions that can be unlocked by collecting stars. Patterns of line mainly designed in narrow and zig-zag shapes. Player can unlock levels by watching five videos sequentially. In some circumstances, videos may not prepared by watching in short period of time. In addition, Dancing Ballz introduced timer and life system to gameplay mechanic, limiting player to advance the level progress at a specific period. Extra lives are offered by Easter eggs, which displays erroneously as 999 in heads-up display.

== Reception ==
In Appgamer, the game met positive reviews scoring 3.3/5. In AppGrooves, it scored 4.2/5 rate with less positive reviews. In AppsMeNow, Color Line received favorable reviews, aggregating 88%.
