= Block Blast! =

Block Blast
- Developer: Hungry Studio
- Platforms: iOS, Android
- Release: April 3, 2022 (iOS) September 23, 2022 (Android)
- Genre: Puzzle

Block Blast
- Stylized as: Block Blast!
- Owner: Hungry Studio
- Website: www.blockblast.com

Block Blast! is a puzzle game launched on April 3, 2022 for iOS, and September 23, 2022 for Android, It is available for iPad, Android, and iPhone devices. It is a game where users have to combine colored blocks. Designed with numerous levels, the puzzle game usually leads the charts in terms of downloads. As of January 2026, it was the world's most downloaded game. By March of the same year, its MAUs had reached 300 million. It comes in Classic and Adventure Master modes.

Developed by Hungry Studio, it is a widely used mobile game, and is often compared to Roblox. It's a Free-to-play game, but it contains in-app ads. Although it was introduced as an online game, it supports offline play. As a casual game, some say it provides simple gameplay. In addition, in this game, extra points can be earned through combos. In April 2026, it appeared at the Coachella Music Festival.

== History ==
Block Blast! was launched in 2021. In September 2025, it entered into a collaboration with Govee. As of January 2026, the daily active users of the game reached 70 million.

In May 2026, Block Blast! attended the GameVerse Expo in Vietnam. By June of the same year, the puzzle game had operated in several markets, such as the U.S., Italy, and Brazil.
