= .Gears =

Vietnamese video game developer

DotGears Company Limited
- Trade name: .Gears
- Company type: Private
- Industry: Video games
- Founded: 2005; 20 years ago
- Founder: Dong Nguyen
- Headquarters: Hanoi, Vietnam
- Key people: Dong Nguyen
- Products: Flappy Bird; Swing Copters
- Number of employees: 5 (2022)
- Website: dotgears.com

.Gears (DotGears Company Limited) is a Vietnamese video game developer based in Hanoi that specialises in hypercasual mobile games. The company was founded in 2005 by Dong Nguyen, (Note: Vietnamese: Nguyễn Hà Đông) and is best known for developing the 2013 game Flappy Bird, which became popular due to its simple mechanics but high difficulty. As of December 2015, the company employs six people, including Nguyen.

After releasing multiple games that copied the Flappy Bird mechanics, .Gears partnered with Japanese developer Obokaidem, which the developer maintained would be .Gears' only partner "for the foreseeable future". In January 2017, the two companies released their first co-developed game, Ninja Spinki Challenges!!, which is nothing like its previous titles and is composed of different mini-games. It uses different mechanics compared to Flappy Bird but is still considered by critics to be equally difficult.

== Games developed ==
- Ninjas Assault
- Shuriken Block (2013)
- Droplet Shuffle (2013)
- Smashing Kitty
- Flappy Bird (2013)
- Super Ball Juggling
- Flappy Birds Family (2014)
- Swing Copters (2014)
- Swing Copters 2 (2015)
- Fabitalk (2015)
- Ninja Spinki Challenges!! (2017)
- BOOP (2022)
