= Estoty =

Mobile game company

Estoty LLC
- Industry: Video game development
- Founded: 2012
- Headquarters: Riga, Latvia
- Website: estoty.com

Estoty LLC is a mobile game studio based in Riga, Latvia and Vilnius, Lithuania.

== History ==
Estoty was founded in 2012 in Riga, Latvia by Guntis Pontags and Vasilijs Siņicins. In 2014, a second studio of the company was founded in Vilnius, Lithuania.

In 2018 and 2019, the Latvian Game Awards named Prince of Persia: Escape and Battle Disc as the "Best Hyper Casual Game”.

In 2020, the company's games were among the Top 20 games in the Apple App Store and Google Play Store. As of 2020, games created by the Estoty Mobile Game Studio have been downloaded more than 1.5 billion times. In the same year, the action game Johnny Trigger became the "Game of the Year" at the Lithuanian Game Award Ceremony. Johnny Trigger was the most downloaded game in the world in January 2020.

Estoty specializes in creating hyper-casual mobile games. Among its most famous games are Johnny Trigger, 2048, Knife Hit, Jelly Shift, Prince of Persia: Escape, and Pixel Rush.
