= Omnidirectional =

Omnidirectional refers to the notion of existing in every direction. Omnidirectional devices include:

- Omnidirectional antenna, an antenna that radiates equally in all directions
- VHF omnidirectional range, a type of radio navigation system for aircraft
- Omnidirectional camera, a camera that can see all 360 degrees around it
- Omnidirectional treadmill, a treadmill that allows a person to walk in any direction without moving
- Omnidirectional microphone, a microphone that can hear from all directions
- Mecanum wheel, a specially designed wheel that allows movement in any direction, such as that used by many robots in the RoboCup Small Size League
- Wingless Electromagnetic Air Vehicle, an electrically operated vehicle that can fly in any direction
