= Flappy Bird =

2013 mobile game

- App icon
- Developer: .Gears
- Publisher: .Gears
- Designer: Dong Nguyen
- Platforms: iOS, Android
- Release: iOS; May 24, 2013; Android; January 30, 2014
- Genre: Casual
- Mode: Single-player

Flappy Bird is a 2013 casual mobile game developed by Vietnamese video game artist and programmer Dong Nguyen (Vietnamese: Nguyễn Hà Đông), under his game development company .Gears. The game is a side-scroller where the player controls a bird, Faby, attempting to fly between columns of green pipes without hitting them. The player's score is determined by the number of pipes they fly through. Nguyen created the game over a period of several days, using the bird from a cancelled game made in 2012.

The game was released in May 2013 but received a sudden spike in popularity in early 2014, becoming a sleeper hit. Flappy Bird received poor reviews from some critics, who criticized its high level of difficulty and alleged plagiarism in graphics and game mechanics, while other reviewers found it addictive. At the end of January 2014, it was the most downloaded free game in the App Store for iOS. During this period, its developer said that Flappy Bird was earning $50,000 a day from in-app advertisements as well as sales.

Flappy Bird was removed from both the App Store and Google Play on February 10, 2014, with Nguyen claiming that he felt guilty over what he considered to be the game's addictive nature and overusage. Its popularity and sudden removal caused phones with the game installed before its removal to be put up for sale for high prices over the Internet. It ended up becoming one of the best mobile games of all time. Clones of Flappy Bird became popular on the App Store after the original app's removal, and both Apple and Google have removed games from their app stores for being too similar.

In August 2014, a revised version of Flappy Bird, called Flappy Birds Family, was released exclusively for the Amazon Fire TV. Bay Tek Games also released a licensed coin-operated Flappy Bird arcade game.

== Gameplay ==
Faby after passing the first pair of pipes

Flappy Bird is an arcade-style game in which the player controls the bird Faby, which moves persistently to the right. They are tasked with navigating Faby through pairs of pipes that have equally sized gaps placed at random heights. Faby automatically descends and only ascends when the player taps the touchscreen. Each successful pass through a pair of pipes awards the player one point. Colliding with a pipe or the ground ends the gameplay. During the game over screen, the player is awarded a bronze medal if they reach ten or more points, a silver medal from twenty points, a gold medal from thirty points, and a platinum medal from forty points.

== Development ==
Dong Nguyen grew up in Vạn Phúc, a village near Hanoi. He discovered video games by playing Super Mario Bros. as a child and began coding his own at age 16. At 19, while studying programming at a local university, he won an internship at Punch Entertainment, one of the few video game companies in Vietnam. While using the iPhone, he found that its most popular games such as Angry Birds were too complicated, and wanted to make a simpler game for people who are "always on the move".

Flappy Bird was created and developed by Nguyen in two to three days. The game was originally called "Flap Flap". The bird character, Faby, was originally designed in 2012 for a cancelled platform game. The gameplay was inspired by the act of bouncing a ping pong ball against a paddle for as long as possible. Initially the game was significantly easier than it became in the final version, but Nguyen said he found this version to be boring and subsequently tightened up the difficulty. He described the business plan of a free download with in-game advertisements as "very common in the Japanese market".

Nguyen believes that contemporary Western games are overly complex. His company, .Gears, describes its games as "heavily influenced by retro pixelated games in its golden age. Everything is pure, extremely hard and incredibly fun to play".

== Release ==
Flappy Bird was originally released on May 24, 2013, with support for the iPhone 5. The game was subsequently updated for iOS 7 in September 2013. Although originally unsuccessful, the game received a massive influx of players after being reviewed by the Swedish YouTuber PewDiePie. In January 2014, it topped the Free Apps chart in the US and Chinese App Stores, and later that month topped the same section of the UK App Store where it was touted as "the new Angry Birds". It ended January as the most downloaded App on the App Store. The Android version of Flappy Bird was released to the Google Play store on January 30, 2014. In early 2014, Nguyen said in an interview with The Verge that the game was earning around $50,000 a day in revenue through its in-game advertising.

=== Discontinuation ===
On February 8, 2014, Nguyen announced on Twitter that the game would be removed from both Apple's App Store and Google Play, writing: "I am sorry Flappy Bird users, 22 hours from now, I will take Flappy Bird down. I cannot take this anymore." He went on to say that taking down the game had "nothing to do with legal issues". The game was removed from both the App Store and Google Play exactly on time, much to the dismay of many fans.

Tuoi Tre News, the English-language edition of the Vietnamese newspaper Tuổi Trẻ, reported from a local technology expert that Flappy Bird's removal could have been due to a legal challenge from Nintendo over perceived visual similarities to the Mario games. This allegation was denied by a Nintendo spokesman to The Wall Street Journal. Lawyers in Vietnam also denied allegations that Nguyen had to remove the game due to violation of laws on Internet use in the country.

Following the removal, many media outlets reported that several merchants on eBay were offering phones which had the app pre-installed for US$1,499 or more, with some receiving bids of over $90,000; however, the listings were removed for violating eBay's rule stating that smartphones must be restored to factory settings before being sold.

In an interview with Forbes, Nguyen cited the game's addictive nature for its cancellation, stating: "Flappy Bird was designed to play in a few minutes when you are relaxed. But it happened to become an addictive product. I think it has become a problem. To solve that problem, it's best to take down Flappy Bird. It's gone forever." Nguyen said that the guilt that he felt over the game was affecting his sleep and that his conscience was relieved after he took down the game.

In a March 2014 interview with Rolling Stone, Nguyen refused to rule out re-releasing Flappy Bird, on condition that it would come with a warning to "Take a break". On March 19, he announced via Twitter that the game will be rereleased onto App Stores, but not any time soon. On May 15, Nguyen told CNBC's Kelly Evans that the game would return in August, with multiplayer capability and will be "less addictive".

As Nguyen had promised, August 2014 saw a revised version of Flappy Bird, called Flappy Birds Family, released exclusively through the Amazon Appstore for the Amazon Fire TV platform. The new version also features new obstacles not in the original as well as an additional multiplayer option.

=== Unofficial reboot ===
On January 12, 2024, the trademark for Flappy Bird was terminated and subsequently handed over to Gametech Holdings after Dong Nguyen had failed to reclaim it. Gametech announced an unofficial reboot to the game on September 12, more than ten years after its discontinuation, under the name "The Flappy Bird Foundation", with additional features and characters. The game was released at the end of October 2024 with the mobile version being released in 2025. Nguyen stated that he has no connection with this game, nor did he sell any rights to the games.

== Reception ==
Reception

Aggregate score
| Aggregator | Score |
|---|---|
| Metacritic | 52/100 |

Review scores
| Publication | Score |
|---|---|
| Gamezebo | 3.5/5 |
| IGN | 5.4/10 |
| USgamer | 1/5 |

Flappy Bird received "mixed or average reviews" from critics, holding a Metacritic score of 52/100, based on seven reviews. The app was criticized by the Huffington Post, which described it as an "insanely irritating, difficult and frustrating game which combines a super-steep difficulty curve with bad, boring graphics and jerky movement". IGN gave the game a mediocre score of 5.4 out of 10, quipping that the game was as addictive as it was shallow. Despite criticizing its playability and its "no skill" requirement, IGN noted that the gameplay made it "an addictive short-term distraction" for the casual skill and score-obsessed players. The game's difficulty has been a source of ire for many users, with one user stating that it took him half an hour to achieve a score of five points. According to its creator, the game is slightly easier on Android devices than on iOS.

=== Controversy and criticism ===
When questioned at the time by Chocolate Lab Apps, a website for app developers, Nguyen claimed to have used no promotional methods in the marketing of Flappy Bird. He credited the sudden rise in the game's popularity in early 2014 to possibly be "luck". However, online marketer Carter Thomas suspected that the developer had used bots to cause its success. When questioned on this by The Daily Telegraph, Nguyen said that he respected other people's opinions and did not wish to comment, adding, "I'd like to make my games in peace." When Newsweek inquired about the matter, Nguyen wrote, "If I did fake it, should Apple let it live for months?"

The game was criticised by Kotaku for what it claimed was overt use of Mario-style graphics, referring to it as "ripped-off art". It later published a correction, clarifying that the game's green pipe was "a new albeit unoriginal drawing".

According to some Vietnamese newspapers, including Thanh Niên and BBC Vietnamese, Flappy Bird is very similar to a game released in 2011 (two years before Flappy Bird) called Piou Piou vs. Cactus, from the gameplay (by tapping on the screen) to the main character design (a small yellow bird with big red beak) to the obstacles (green cacti and pipes). Several French newspapers, including 20 minutes and Metronews, reported on claims of Flappy Bird itself being a clone. Thanh Niên found the similarities between Piou Piou vs. Cactus and Flappy Bird to be astonishing.

The French developer of Piou Piou vs. Cactus, known as Kek, told Pocket Gamer that he, too, noticed that Flappy Bird is "very similar" to his earlier game. Kek contacted Nguyen, who said that when he created Flappy Bird, "he doesn't think he knew about" Kek's game. Technology editor Patrick O'Rourke of Canada.com also charged that Flappy Bird is "almost a complete ripoff" of Piou Piou vs Cactus, as well as that its primary gameplay mechanic is a "rip off" from a game called Helicopter Game, and that it heavily borrowed sound effects from Super Mario Bros. games.

== Legacy ==
Since the game's removal, numerous remakes and parodies have been spawned, such as Sesame Street's Flappy Bert and Fall Out Boy's Fall Out Bird. Flappy Bird became one of the most cloned games in Apple's App Store. At the peak of its popularity, over 60 clones per day were appearing on the App Store, prompting both Google and Apple to begin rejecting games with the word Flappy in the name. CNET reviewed seven "Flappy copycats" for iOS two days after the original game's removal, describing the options as "pretty bleak", but singling out the underwater Splashy Fish as the closest approximation of Flappy Bird.

Shortly after the game's removal, security researchers warned that some versions of Flappy Bird and its imitators available on alternative Android app stores have been found to contain malware that can lead to unauthorised charges to a user's phone bills. The number matching game Threes has been compared to Flappy Bird because of the similarities between how people react to them and by the chain of clones that they are both respectively part of.

In February 2014, the non-profit computer science education organization Code.org unveiled a set of lessons that would allow the student to make their own Flappy Bird clone.

Nguyen's other games Super Ball Juggling and Shuriken Block ranked at 6th and 18th respectively on the App Store during early February 2014 on the back of Flappy Bird's success. He revealed in March 2014 that he was developing three other games at the time, in similar formats to his previous releases. One of those games was released in 2014 as Swing Copters and uses similar gameplay as Flappy Bird.

An Easter egg in Android Lollipop (version 5.0/5.1) allows users to play a modified version of Flappy Bird, entitled "L Land", involving a flying Android and Lollipops replacing the pipes. It was revamped in Android Marshmallow (version 6.0) as "Marshmallow Lad", adding multiplayer support for up to 6 players.

On New Year's Eve in 2014, Google displayed an animated Google Doodle featuring Flappy Bird as one of the year's most searched phenomena, alongside the World Cup, the Ice Bucket Challenge and the Philae spacecraft. A similar game featuring Talking Tom was released as a mini-game for My Talking Tom, called Flappy Tom, and the same game was featured in Talking Tom and Friends.

In 2016, video game player and livestreamer SethBling replicated Flappy Bird within Super Mario World through code injection.

In June 2023, the dwarf mining game Deep Rock Galactic's Season 04 update put an arcade cabinet into the in-game bar containing the Flappy Bird parody game "Jetty Boot" as a "training module" for obtaining the Jet Boots players can find in the game's missions.

In September 2026, the Trump administration released a Flappy Bird clone entitled Flappy Bill on the White House website.
