= Pham Huu Tiep =

Vietnamese-American mathematician

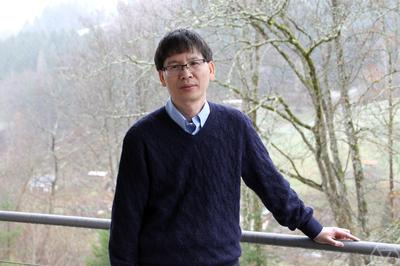
Pham Tiep at Oberwolfach in 2020

Pham Huu Tiep (Vietnamese: Phạm Hữu Tiệp) is a Vietnamese-American mathematician specializing in group theory and representation theory. He is currently a Joshua Barlaz Distinguished Professor of Mathematics at Rutgers University. He was previously at the University of Florida.

Pham Tiep graduated from Chu Văn An High School, and received a silver medal at the IMO in London in 1979. He received his Ph.D. at Moscow University in 1988 under supervision of Alexei Kostrikin. He gave an invited talk at the International Congress of Mathematicians in Rio de Janeiro in 2018. He is a Fellow of the American Mathematical Society, a Clay Institute Senior Scholar, and a Simons Fellow.

Pham was the fifth Vietnamese mathematician invited to speak at the International Congress of Mathematicians, following Frédéric Pham (1970), Duong Hong Phong (1994), Ngô Bảo Châu (2006,2010) and Van H. Vu (2014).

Pham was a member of the 2010 collaboration which completed the proof of Ore's conjecture.

In a September 2024 paper, Pham, along with Gunter Malle, Gabriel Navarro and Amanda Schaeffer Fry, proved Brauer's height zero conjecture on the modular representation theory of Brauer blocks and their defect groups.

Also in 2024, Pham, along with Michael Larsen and others, derived uniform character bounds for various finite classical groups, leading to substantial progress on Thompson's conjecture that each finite non-abelian simple group $G = C^2$ for some conjugacy class $C \subseteq G$.

== Selected papers ==
- 2018: "Character bounds for finite groups of Lie type", Acta Math. 221 (2018), 1 – 57 (with Roman Bezrukavnikov, Martin Liebeck, and Aner Shalev)
- 2016: Huu Tiep, Pham (2016). "The $\alpha$-invariant and Thompson's conjecture". Forum of Mathematics, Pi. 4. doi:10.1017/fmp.2016.3. ISSN 2050-5086. e5, 28 pages
- 2013: "Characters of relative p'-degree over normal subgroups", Ann. of Math. 178 (2013), 1135 – 1171 (with Gabriel Navarro)
- 2011: "Waring problem for finite simple groups", Ann. of Math. 174 (2011), 1885 – 1950 (with Michael Larsen and Aner Shalev)
- 2011: "A reduction theorem for the Alperin weight conjecture", Invent. Math. 184 (2011), 529 – 565 (with Gabriel Navarro)
- 2010: "The Ore conjecture", Journal of the European Mathematical Society (with Martin Liebeck, EA O'Brien, Aner Shalev)
- 2008: "Symmetric powers and a problem of Kollar and Larsen", Invent. Math. 174 (2008), 505 – 554 (with Robert M. Guralnick)
