= McKay conjecture =

Theorem in group theory

In mathematics, specifically in the field of group theory, the McKay conjecture is a theorem of equality between two numbers: the number of irreducible complex characters of degree not divisible by a prime number $p$ for a given finite group and the same number for the normalizer in that group of a Sylow $p$-subgroup.

It is named after the Canadian mathematician John McKay, who originally stated a limited version of it as a conjecture in 1971, for the special case of $p=2$ and simple groups. The conjecture was later generalized by other mathematicians to a more general conjecture for any prime value of $p$ and more general groups.

In 2023, a proof of the general conjecture was announced by Britta Späth and Marc Cabanes.

== Statement ==
Suppose $p$ is a prime number, $G$ is a finite group, and $P \leq G$ is a Sylow $p$-subgroup. Define

$$\textrm{Irr}_{p'}(G) := \{\chi \in \textrm{Irr}(G) : p \nmid
\chi(1) \}$$

where $\textrm{Irr}(G)$ denotes the set of complex irreducible characters of the group $G$. The McKay conjecture claims the equality

$$|\textrm{Irr}_{p'}(G)| = |\textrm{Irr}_{p'}(N_G(P))|$$

where $N_G(P)$ is the normalizer of $P$ in $G$.

In other words, for any finite group $G$, the number of its irreducible complex representations whose dimension is not divisible by $p$ equals that number for the normalizer of any of its Sylow $p$-subgroups. (Here we count isomorphic representations as the same.)

== History ==
In McKay's original papers on the subject, the statement was given for the prime $p=2$ and simple groups, but examples of computations of $|\textrm{Irr}_{p'}(G)|$ for odd primes or symmetric groups are mentioned. Marty Isaacs also checked the conjecture for the prime 2 and solvable groups $G$. The first appearance of the conjecture for arbitrary primes is in a paper by Jon L. Alperin giving also a version in block theory, now called the Alperin–McKay conjecture.

== Proof ==
In 2007, Martin Isaacs, Gunter Malle and Gabriel Navarro showed that the McKay conjecture reduces to the checking of a so-called inductive McKay condition for each finite simple group. This opens the door to a proof of the conjecture by using the classification of finite simple groups.

The Isaacs−Malle−Navarro paper was also an inspiration for similar reductions for Alperin weight conjecture (named after Jonathan Lazare Alperin), its block version, the Alperin−McKay conjecture, and Dade's conjecture (named after Everett C. Dade).

The McKay conjecture for the prime 2 was proven by Britta Späth and Gunter Malle in 2016.

An important step in proving the inductive McKay condition for all simple groups is to determine the action of the automorphism group $\textrm{Aut}(G)$ on the set $\textrm{Irr}(G)$ for each finite quasisimple group $G$. The solution was given by Späth in the form of an $\textrm{Aut}(G)$-equivariant Jordan decomposition of characters for finite quasisimple groups of Lie type.

A proof of the McKay conjecture for all primes and all finite groups was announced by Britta Späth and Marc Cabanes in October 2023 in various conferences, a manuscript being available later in 2024.
