= Richard Brauer =

German-American mathematician

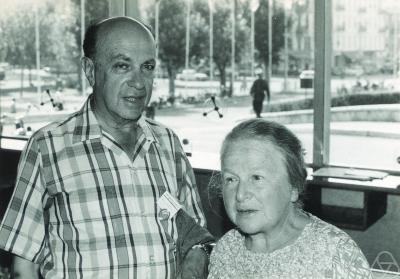
- Richard and Ilse Brauer in 1970; Photo courtesy MFO
- Born: February 10, 1901; Charlottenburg, German Empire
- Died: April 17, 1977 (aged 76); Belmont, Massachusetts, U.S.
- Education: University of Berlin (PhD, 1926)
- Known for: Brauer's theorem on induced characters
- Awards: Cole Prize in Algebra (1949); National Medal of Science (1970)
- Scientific career
- Fields: Scientist, mathematician
- Workplaces: University of Kentucky; University of Toronto; University of Michigan; Harvard University
- Thesis: Über die Darstellung der Drehungsgruppe durch Gruppen linearer Substitutionen (1926)
- Doctoral advisor: Issai Schur; Erhard Schmidt
- Doctoral students: R. H. Bruck; I. Martin Isaacs; S. A. Jennings; Peter Landrock; D. J. Lewis; J. Carson Mark; Cecil J. Nesbitt; Donald S. Passman; Ralph Stanton; Robert Steinberg

Richard Dagobert Brauer (February 10, 1901 – April 17, 1977) was a German and American mathematician. He worked mainly in abstract algebra, but made important contributions to number theory. He was the founder of modular representation theory.

== Education and career ==
Alfred Brauer was Richard's brother and seven years older. They were born to a Jewish family. Both were interested in science and mathematics, but Alfred was injured in combat in World War I. As a boy, Richard dreamt of becoming an inventor, and in February 1919 enrolled in Technische Hochschule Berlin-Charlottenburg. He soon transferred to University of Berlin. Except for the summer of 1920 when he studied at University of Freiburg, he studied in Berlin, being awarded his PhD on 16 March 1926. Issai Schur conducted a seminar and posed a problem in 1921 that Alfred and Richard worked on together, and published a result. The problem also was solved by Heinz Hopf at the same time. Richard wrote his thesis under Schur, providing an algebraic approach to irreducible, continuous, finite-dimensional representations of real orthogonal (rotation) groups.

Ilse Karger also studied mathematics at the University of Berlin; she and Brauer were married 17 September 1925. Their sons George Ulrich (born 1927) and Fred Gunther (born 1932) also became mathematicians. Brauer began his teaching career in Königsberg (now Kaliningrad) working as Konrad Knopp’s assistant. Brauer expounded central division algebras over a perfect field while in Königsberg; the isomorphism classes of such algebras form the elements of the Brauer group he introduced.

When the Nazi Party took over in 1933, the Emergency Committee in Aid of Displaced Foreign Scholars took action to help Brauer and other Jewish scientists. Brauer was offered an assistant professorship at University of Kentucky. Brauer accepted the offer, and by the end of 1933 he was in Lexington, Kentucky, teaching in English. Ilse followed the next year with George and Fred; brother Alfred made it to the United States in 1939, but their sister Alice was killed in the Holocaust.

Hermann Weyl invited Brauer to assist him at Princeton's Institute for Advanced Study in 1934. Brauer and Nathan Jacobson edited Weyl's lectures Structure and Representation of Continuous Groups. Through the influence of Emmy Noether, Brauer was invited to University of Toronto to take up a faculty position. With his graduate student Cecil J. Nesbitt he developed modular representation theory, published in 1937. Robert Steinberg, Stephen Arthur Jennings, and Ralph Stanton were also Brauer’s students in Toronto. Brauer also conducted international research with Tadasi Nakayama on representations of algebras. In 1941 University of Wisconsin hosted visiting professor Brauer. The following year he visited the Institute for Advanced Study and Bloomington, Indiana where Emil Artin was teaching.

In 1948, Brauer moved to Ann Arbor, Michigan where he and Robert M. Thrall contributed to the program in modern algebra at University of Michigan.

In 1952, Brauer joined the faculty of Harvard University and retired in 1971. His students included Donald John Lewis, Donald Passman, and I. Martin Isaacs. Brauer was elected to the American Academy of Arts and Sciences in 1954, the United States National Academy of Sciences in 1955, and the American Philosophical Society in 1974. The Brauers frequently traveled to see their friends such as Reinhold Baer, Werner Wolfgang Rogosinski, and Carl Ludwig Siegel.

== Mathematical work ==
Several theorems bear his name, including Brauer's induction theorem, which has applications in number theory as well as finite group theory, and its corollary Brauer's characterization of characters, which is central to the theory of group characters.

The Brauer–Fowler theorem, published in 1956, later provided significant impetus towards the classification of finite simple groups, for it implied that there could only be finitely many finite simple groups for which the centralizer of an involution (element of order 2) had a specified structure.

Brauer introduced the idea of "resolvent degree" in 1975. He applied modular representation theory to obtain subtle information about group characters, particularly via his three main theorems. These methods were particularly useful in the classification of finite simple groups with low rank Sylow 2-subgroups. The Brauer–Suzuki theorem showed that no finite simple group could have a generalized quaternion Sylow 2-subgroup, and the Alperin–Brauer–Gorenstein theorem classified finite groups with wreathed or quasidihedral Sylow 2-subgroups. The methods developed by Brauer were also instrumental in contributions by others to the classification program: for example, the Gorenstein–Walter theorem, classifying finite groups with a dihedral Sylow 2-subgroup, and Glauberman's Z* theorem. The theory of a block with a cyclic defect group, first worked out by Brauer in the case when the principal block has defect group of order p, and later worked out in full generality by E. C. Dade, also had several applications to group theory, for example to finite groups of matrices over the complex numbers in small dimension. The Brauer tree is a combinatorial object associated to a block with cyclic defect group which encodes much information about the structure of the block.

Brauer formulated numerous influential problems on modular representation theory, among which the Brauer height zero conjecture and the k(B) conjecture.

In 1970, he was awarded the National Medal of Science.

== Hypercomplex numbers ==
Eduard Study had written an article on hypercomplex numbers for Klein's encyclopedia in 1898. This article was expanded for the French language edition by Henri Cartan in 1908. By the 1930s there was evident need to update Study’s article, and Brauer was commissioned to write on the topic for the project. As it turned out, when Brauer had his manuscript prepared in Toronto in 1936, though it was accepted for publication, politics and war intervened. Nevertheless, Brauer kept his manuscript through the 1940s, 1950s, and 1960s, and in 1979 it was published by Okayama University in Japan. It also appeared posthumously as paper #22 in the first volume of his Collected Papers. His title was "Algebra der hyperkomplexen Zahlensysteme (Algebren)". Unlike the articles by Study and Cartan, which were exploratory, Brauer’s article reads as a modern abstract algebra text with its universal coverage. Consider his introduction:

In the beginning of the 19th century, the usual complex numbers and their introduction through computations with number-pairs or points in the plane, became a general tool of mathematicians. Naturally the question arose whether or not a similar "hypercomplex" number can be defined using points of n-dimensional space. As it turns out, such extension of the system of real numbers requires the concession of some of the usual axioms (Weierstrass 1863). The selection of rules of computation, which cannot be avoided in hypercomplex numbers, naturally allows some choice. Yet in any cases set out, the resulting number systems allow a unique theory with regard to their structural properties and their classification. Further, one desires that these theories stand in close connection with other areas of mathematics, wherewith the possibility of their applications is given.

While still in Königsberg in 1929, Brauer published an article in Mathematische Zeitschrift "Über Systeme hyperkomplexer Zahlen" which was primarily concerned with integral domains (Nullteilerfrei systeme) and the field theory which he used later in Toronto.

== Publications ==
- Brauer, R.; Sah, Chih-han, eds. (1969), Theory of finite groups: A symposium, W. A. Benjamin, Inc., New York-Amsterdam, MR 0240186
- Brauer, R. (1980), Fong, Paul; Wong, Warren J. (eds.), Collected Papers. Vol. I, Mathematicians of Our Time, vol. 17, MIT Press, ISBN 978-0-262-02135-7, MR 0581120
- Brauer, R. (1980), Fong, Paul; Wong, Warren J. (eds.), Collected Papers. Vol. II, Mathematicians of Our Time, vol. 18, MIT Press, ISBN 978-0-262-02148-7, MR 0581120
- Brauer, R. (1980), Fong, Paul; Wong, Warren J. (eds.), Collected Papers. Vol. III, Mathematicians of Our Time, vol. 19, MIT Press, ISBN 978-0-262-02149-4, MR 0581120

== See also ==
- Brauer algebra
- Brauer–Cartan–Hua theorem
- Brauer–Nesbitt theorem
- Brauer–Manin obstruction
- Brauer–Siegel theorem
- Brauer's theorem on forms
- Albert–Brauer–Hasse–Noether theorem
- Weyl-Brauer matrices
