= Brauer's theorem =

In mathematics, Brauer's theorem, named for Richard Brauer, may refer to:

- Brauer's theorem on forms
- Brauer's theorem on induced characters (also called the Brauer-Tate theorem).
- Brauer's main theorems
- Brauer–Suzuki theorem

== See also ==
- Brouwer fixed-point theorem
