= Gunter Malle =

German mathematician

Gunter Malle (born 13 May 1960 in Karlsruhe) is a German mathematician, specializing in group theory, representation theory of finite groups, and number theory.

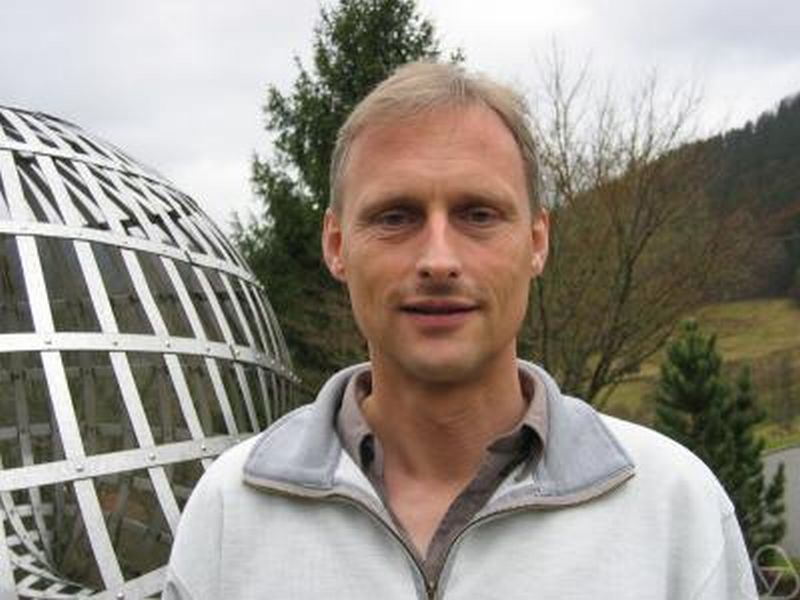
Malle at Oberwolfach, 2006

Malle received his doctorate in 1986 from Karlsruhe Institute of Technology under the supervision of Heinrich Matzat with the thesis Exceptional groups of Lie type as Galois groups. He completed his habilitation in 1991 at Heidelberg University and from 1998 was a professor at Kassel University. Since 2005 he has been a professor at the Technische Universität Kaiserslautern.

Malle does research on linear algebraic groups, finite groups of Lie type and local-global conjectures in finite-group representation theory, e.g. Brauer's Height Zero Conjecture, the Alperin weight conjecture, and the McKay conjecture and its block-wise version known as the Alperin-McKay conjecture. Malle's research also deals with the Cohen-Lenstra heuristic of the structure of class groups of quadratic number fields in algebraic number theory, the asymptotic distribution of Galois groups of number fields, and with the inverse problem of Galois theory.

In 1993 he began a collaboration with Michel Broué and Jean Michel concerning Spetses (named after the Greek island Σπέτσες where the program was initiated). The starting point was the question of whether every finite complex reflection group is a Weyl group of an object analogous to a finite group of Lie type. They baptized the unknown, yet to be constructed, objects Spetses.

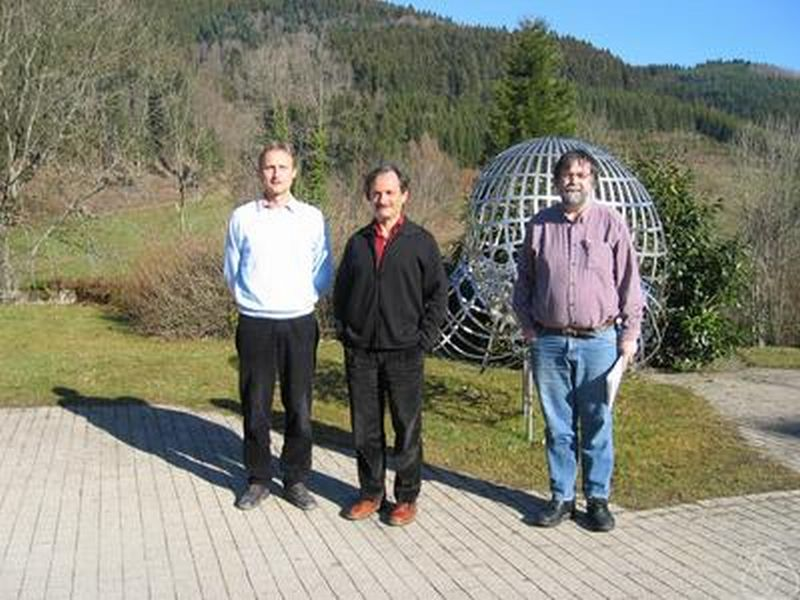
Malle (left), Michel Broué, Jean Michel, Oberwolfach 2004

In 1998, he was an Invited Speaker with talk Spetses at the International Congress of Mathematicians in Berlin.

In 1994 he received the Alexander von Humboldt Research Award for Franco-German scientific cooperation.

== Selected publications ==
- with Gabriel Navarro, A. Schaeffer Fry, and P. H. Tiep: Brauer's height zero conjecture , Annals of Mathematics, Vol. 200, 2024, pp. 557–608
- with Olivier Dudas: Modular irreducibility of cuspidal unipotent characters , Invent. Math., Vol. 211, 2018, pp. 579–589 doi:10.1007/s00222-017-0753-1
- with Britta Späth: Characters of odd degree , Annals of Mathematics, Vol. 184, 2016, pp. 869–908 JSTOR 44072032
- with Caroline Lassueur and Elisabeth Schulte: Simple endotrivial modules for quasi-simple groups , J. reine angew. Math., Volume 712, 2016, pp. 141–174 doi:10.1515/crelle-2013-0100
- with Michel Broué and Jean Michel: Split Spetses for primitive reflection groups. Société mathématique de France, 2014. arXiv preprint
- with Radha Kessar: Quasi-isolated blocks and Brauer's height zero conjecture , Annals of Mathematics, Vol. 178, 2013, pp. 321–384 JSTOR 23470826
- with Robert Guralnick: "Products of conjugacy classes and fixed point spaces", J. Amer. Math. Soc., Vol. 25, 2012, pp. 77–121 doi:10.1090/S0894-0347-2011-00709-1
- with Donna Testerman: Linear algebraic groups and Finite Groups of Lie Type, Cambridge University Press 2011
- with Marty Isaacs and Gabriel Navarro: A reduction theorem for the McKay conjecture, Invent. Math., Vol. 170, 2007, pp. 33–101 doi:10.1007/s00222-007-0057-y
- with Jürgen Klüners: Counting nilpotent Galois extensions, J. reine angew. Math., Vol. 572, 2004, p. 1–26 doi:10.1515/crll.2004.050
- with Heinrich Matzat: Inverse Galois Theory, Springer Verlag 1999
- with Michel Broué and Raphaël Rouquier: Complex reflection groups, braid groups, Hecke algebras, J. reine angew. Math., Vol. 500, 1998, pp. 127–190
- with Michel Broué and Jean Michel: Représentations unipotentes génériques et blocs des groupes réductifs finis, Société Mathématique de France, 1993 (with appendix by George Lusztig)
- Exceptional groups of Lie type as Galois groups, J. reine angew. Math., Vol. 392, 1988, pp. 70–109 doi:10.1515/crll.1988.392.70
