= Brauer–Nesbitt theorem =

In mathematics, the Brauer–Nesbitt theorem can refer to several different theorems proved by Richard Brauer and Cecil J. Nesbitt in the representation theory of finite groups.

In modular representation theory, the Brauer–Nesbitt theorem on blocks of defect zero states that a character whose order is divisible by the highest power of a prime p dividing the order of a finite group remains irreducible when reduced mod p and vanishes on all elements whose order is divisible by p. Moreover, it belongs to a block of defect zero. A block of defect zero contains only one ordinary character and only one modular character.

Another version states that if k is a field of characteristic zero, A is a k-algebra, V, W are semisimple A-modules which are finite dimensional over k, and Tr_{V} = Tr_{W} as elements of Hom_{k}(A,k), then V and W are isomorphic as A-modules.

Let $G$ be a group and $E$ be some field. If $\rho_i:G\to GL_n(E),i=1,2$ are two finite-dimensional semisimple representations such that the characteristic polynomials of $\rho_1(g)$ and $\rho_2(g)$ coincide for all $g\in G$, then $\rho_1$ and $\rho_2$ are isomorphic representations. If $char(E)=0$ or $char(E)>n$, then the condition on the characteristic polynomials can be changed to the condition that Tr$\rho_1(g)$=Tr$\rho_2(g)$ for all $g\in G$.

As a consequence, let $\rho:Gal(K^{\rm{sep}}/K)\to GL_n(\overline{\mathbb{Q}}_l)$ be a semisimple (continuous) $l$-adic representations of the absolute Galois group of some field $K$, unramified outside some finite set of primes $S\subset M_K$. Then the representation is uniquely determined by the values of the traces of $\rho(Frob_p)$ for $p\in M_K^0-S$ (also using the Chebotarev density theorem).
