= Brauer's height zero conjecture =

Conjecture in modular representation theory

The Brauer Height Zero Conjecture is a conjecture in modular representation theory of finite groups relating the degrees of the complex irreducible characters in a Brauer block and the structure of its defect groups. It was formulated by Richard Brauer in 1955. The proof was completed in 2024.

== Statement ==
Let $G$ be a finite group and $p$ a prime. The set ${\rm Irr}(G)$ of irreducible complex characters can be partitioned into Brauer $p$-blocks. To each $p$-block $B$ is canonically associated a conjugacy class of $p$-subgroups of $G$, called the defect groups of $B$. The set of irreducible characters belonging to $B$ is denoted by $\mathrm{Irr}(B)$.

Let $\nu$ be the discrete valuation defined on the integers by $\nu(mp^a)=a$ where $m$ is coprime to $p$. Brauer proved that if $B$ is a block with defect group $D$ then $\nu(\chi(1))\geq \nu(|G:D|)$ for each $\chi\in\mathrm{Irr}(B)$. The height of $\chi$ is defined to be the non-negative integer $h:=\nu(\chi(1))-\nu(|G:D|)$ .

Brauer's Height Zero Conjecture asserts that $\nu(\chi(1))=\nu(|G:D|)$ for all $\chi\in\mathrm{Irr}(B)$ if and only if $D$ is abelian. In other words: all irreducible complex characters belonging to a block have height zero if and only if the block's defect group is abelian.

== History ==
Brauer's Height Zero Conjecture was formulated by Richard Brauer in 1955. It also appeared as Problem 23 in Brauer's list of problems. Brauer's Problem 12 of the same list asks whether the character table of a finite group $G$ determines if its Sylow $p$-subgroups are abelian. Solving Brauer's height zero conjecture for blocks whose defect groups are Sylow $p$-subgroups (or equivalently, that contain a character of degree coprime to $p$) also gives a solution to Brauer's Problem 12.

=== Proof ===
The proof of the if direction of the conjecture was completed by Radha Kessar and Gunter Malle in 2013 after a reduction to finite simple groups by Thomas R. Berger and Reinhard Knörr.

The only if direction was proved for $p$-solvable groups by David Gluck and Thomas R. Wolf in 1984. The so-called generalized Gluck—Wolf theorem, which was a main obstacle towards a proof of the Height Zero Conjecture was proven by Gabriel Navarro and Pham Huu Tiep in 2013. Gabriel Navarro Ortega and Britta Späth showed in 2014 that the so-called inductive Alperin—McKay condition for simple groups implied Brauer's Height Zero Conjecture. Lucas Ruhstorfer completed the proof of these conditions for the case $p=2$ in 2022. The case of odd primes was finally settled by Gunter Malle, Gabriel Navarro, A. A. Schaeffer Fry and Pham Huu Tiep in 2024 using a different reduction theorem.
