= Gabriel Navarro Ortega =

Spanish mathematician

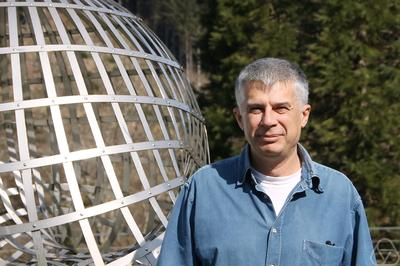
- G. Navarro at Oberwolfach, 2015
- Born: Sueca, Valencia, Spain
- Education: Universitat de València
- Known for: Group theory, representation theory of finite groups, Brauer's Height Zero Conjecture, McKay Conjecture
- Awards: Fellow of the American Mathematical Society, Distinguished Speaker of the European Mathematical Society
- Scientific career
- Fields: Mathematics
- Workplaces: Universitat de València
- Doctoral advisor: I. M. Isaacs

Gabriel Navarro Ortega (born in Sueca, Valencia) is a Spanish mathematician specializing in group theory, and representation theory of finite groups. Currently he is a full professor at the Universitat de València.

== Career ==
Navarro received his PhD at the Universitat de València in 1989. He held a Fulbright post doctoral position at MSRI and at the University of Wisconsin-Madison under the supervision of I. M. Isaacs. He is fellow of the American Mathematical Society and Distinguished Speaker of the European Mathematical Society.

In 2024 together with G. Malle, A. Schaeffer-Fry and P. H. Tiep, he completed the proof of Brauer's Height Zero Conjecture. He also extended the McKay Conjecture (with congruences of degrees modulo p with I. M. Isaacs, and with Galois automorphisms: the Galois-McKay conjecture). Together with I. M. Isaacs and G. Malle, he reduced the McKay conjecture to a question of finite simple groups establishing the path for its final solution by M. Cabanes and B. Späth in 2024. This reduction inspired several other reductions, such as the Alperin Weight Conjecture (with P. H. Tiep) or the Alperin-McKay conjecture (by B. Späth).

== Selected publications ==
- with G. Malle, A. Schaeffer-Fry, P. H. Tiep: Brauer's Height Zero Conjecture, Ann. of Math. 200 (2024), 557–608. doi:10.4007/annals.2024.200.2.4
- with P. H. Tiep: The fields of values of characters of degree not divisible by p. Forum Math. Pi 9 (2021), vol 9, 1-28. doi:10.1017/fmp.2021.1
- Character theory and the McKay conjecture. Cambridge Studies in Advanced Mathematics, 175. Cambridge University Press, Cambridge, 2018. doi:10.1017/9781108552790
- with Britta Spath: On Brauer's Height Zero Conjecture, J. Eur. Math. Soc. 16, 695-747 (2014). doi:10.4171/JEMS/444
- with P. H. Tiep: Characters of relative p'-degree with respect to a normal subgroup, Ann. of Math.178 (3) (2013), 1135–1171. doi:10.4007/annals.2013.178.3.7
- with P. H. Tiep: A reduction theorem for the Alperin weight conjecture. Invent. Math. 184 (2011), no. 3, 529–565. doi:10.1007/s00222-010-0295-2
- with I. M. Isaacs and G. Malle: A reduction theorem for the McKay conjecture. Invent. Math. 170 (2007), no. 1, 33–101. doi:10.1007/s00222-007-0057-y
- The McKay conjecture and Galois automorphisms. Ann. of Math. (2) 160 (2004), no. 3, 1129–1140. doi:10.4007/annals.2004.160.1129
- with I. M. Isaacs: New refinements of the McKay conjecture for arbitrary finite groups. Ann. of Math. (2) 156 (2002), no. 1, 333–344. doi:10.2307/3597192
- Characters and blocks of finite groups. London Mathematical Society Lecture Note Series, 250. Cambridge University Press, Cambridge, 1998. doi:10.1017/CBO9780511526015
