= Bailey W. Diffie =

American historian

Bailey Wallys Diffie (June 27, 1902 – January 12, 1983) was an American historian and teacher of Latin American and Iberian history who focused on Portuguese maritime and colonial history.

== Biography ==
Diffie was born on June 27, 1902, in Detroit, Texas, in the Red River Country. He was the son of a small town lawyer and grew up on a farm. He soon learned Spanish, having studied both Spanish and history at Texas Christian University. He graduated from Southeastern Teachers College in Durant, Oklahoma, in 1923. An early interest in East Asia turned to the Iberian World after taking a Summer course with Edward Everett Dale in 1924. Having sailed to Europe as an apprentice seaman, he returned to TCU and completed an M.A. in 1926. In August 1927 he began to study at the University of Madrid, having spent three years in Spain and France; he received a doctoral degree from Madrid in 1929.

After initially teaching at Texas Christian from 1926 to 1927, Diffie began teaching at the City College of New York in 1930, a position he held for thirty-eight years, with visiting professorships to Yale University, New York City University and Columbia University. He began to write on history by the mid-1930s. He wrote several books and articles on Latin American and Iberian history. He published his historical study Latin American Civilization: Colonial Period in 1945. He was both professor emeritus at City College and a visiting professor at the University of California, Los Angeles.

== Published works ==
- New Governments in Europe (1934)
- Latin-American Civilization: Colonial Period (1945)
- A History of Colonial Brazil: Fifteen Hundred to Seventeen Ninety-Two (1947)
- Prelude to Empire: Portugal Overseas Before Henry the Navigator (1963)
- Foundations of the Portuguese Empire 1415-1580 (1977)
- History of Colonial Brazil, 1500-1792 (1987)

== See also ==
- Whitfield Diffie, son
