= Brauer's k(B) conjecture =

Conjecture in modular representation theory

Richard Brauer's k(B) Conjecture is a conjecture in modular representation theory of finite groups relating the number of complex irreducible characters in a Brauer block and the order of its defect groups. It was first announced in 1946. It is Problem 20 in Brauer's list of problems.

== Statement ==
Let $G$ be a finite group and $p$ a prime. The set ${\rm Irr}(G)$ of irreducible complex characters can be partitioned into $p$-blocks. To each $p$-block $B$ is canonically associated a conjugacy class of $p$-subgroups, called the defect groups of $B$. The set of irreducible characters belonging to $B$ is denoted by $\mathrm{Irr}(B)$.

The k(B) Conjecture asserts that

$$|{\rm Irr}(B)| \leq |D|$$.

== The k(GV) problem ==
In the case of blocks of $p$-solvable groups, the conjecture is equivalent to the following question. Let $V$ be an elementary abelian group of order $p^d$, let $G$ be a finite group of order non-divisible by $p$ and acting faithfully on $V$ by group automorphisms. Let $GV$ denote the associated semidirect product and let $k(GV)$ be its number of conjugacy classes. Then

$$k(GV) \leq |V|.$$

This was proved by John Thompson and Geoffrey Robinson, except for finitely many prime numbers. A proof of the last open cases was published in 2004.
