= Schuette–Nesbitt formula =

In mathematics, the Schuette–Nesbitt formula is a generalization of the inclusion–exclusion principle. It is named after Donald R. Schuette and Cecil J. Nesbitt.

The probabilistic version of the Schuette–Nesbitt formula has practical applications in actuarial science, where it is used to calculate the net single premium for life annuities and life insurances based on the general symmetric status.

== Combinatorial versions ==
Consider a set Ω and subsets A_{1}, ..., A_{m}. Let

$N(\omega)=\sum_{n=1}^m 1_{A_n}(\omega),\qquad \omega\in\Omega,$	1

denote the number of subsets to which ω ∈ Ω belongs, where we use the indicator functions of the sets A_{1}, ..., A_{m}. Furthermore, for each k ∈ {0, 1, ..., m}, let

$N_k(\omega)=\sum_{\scriptstyle J\subset\{1,\ldots,m\}\atop\scriptstyle|J|=k} 1_{\cap_{j\in J}A_j}(\omega),\qquad\omega\in\Omega,$	2

denote the number of intersections of exactly k sets out of A_{1}, ..., A_{m}, to which ω belongs, where the intersection over the empty index set is defined as Ω, hence N_{0} = 1_{Ω}. Let V denote a vector space over a field R such as the real or complex numbers (or more generally a module over a ring R with multiplicative identity). Then, for every choice of c_{0}, ..., c_{m} ∈ V,

$\sum_{n=0}^m 1_{\{N=n\}}c_n = \sum_{k=0}^m N_k\sum_{l=0}^k (-1)^{k-l}\binom klc_l,$	3

where 1_{{N=n}} denotes the indicator function of the set of all ω ∈ Ω with N(ω) = n, and $\textstyle\binom kl$ is a binomial coefficient. Equality (3) says that the two V-valued functions defined on Ω are the same.

=== Proof of (3) ===
We prove that (3) holds pointwise. Take ω ∈ Ω and define n = N(ω). Then the left-hand side of (3) equals c_{n}. Let I denote the set of all those indices i ∈ {1, ..., m} such that ω ∈ A_{i}, hence I contains exactly n indices. Given J ⊂ {1, ..., m} with k elements, then ω belongs to the intersection ∩_{j∈J}A_{j} if and only if J is a subset of I. By the combinatorial interpretation of the binomial coefficient, there are N_{k} = $\textstyle\binom nk$ such subsets (the binomial coefficient is zero for k > n). Therefore the right-hand side of (3) evaluated at ω equals

$$\sum_{k=0}^m \binom nk\sum_{l=0}^k (-1)^{k-l}\binom klc_l
=\sum_{l=0}^m\underbrace{\sum_{k=l}^n (-1)^{k-l}\binom nk \binom kl}_{=:\,(*)} c_l,$$

where we used that the first binomial coefficient is zero for k > n. Note that the sum (*) is empty and therefore defined as zero for n < l. Using the factorial formula for the binomial coefficients, it follows that

$$\begin{align}
(*)
&=\sum_{k=l}^n (-1)^{k-l}\frac{n!}{k!\,(n-k)!}\,\frac{k!}{l!\,(k-l)!}\\
&=\underbrace{\frac{n!}{l!\,(n-l)!}}_{=\binom nl}\underbrace{\sum_{k=l}^n (-1)^{k-l}\frac{(n-l)!}{(n-k)!\,(k-l)!}}_{=:\,(**)}\\
\end{align}$$

Rewriting (**) with the summation index j = k − l und using the binomial formula for the third equality shows that

$$\begin{align}
(**)
&=\sum_{j=0}^{n-l} (-1)^{j}\frac{(n-l)!}{(n-l-j)!\,j!}\\
&=\sum_{j=0}^{n-l} (-1)^{j}\binom{n-l}{j}
=(1-1)^{n-l}
=\delta_{ln},
\end{align}$$

which is the Kronecker delta. Substituting this result into the above formula and noting that n choose l equals 1 for l = n, it follows that the right-hand side of (3) evaluated at ω also reduces to c_{n}.

=== Representation in the polynomial ring ===
As a special case, take for V the polynomial ring R[x] with the indeterminate x. Then (3) can be rewritten in a more compact way as

$\sum_{n=0}^m 1_{\{N=n\}}x^n = \sum_{k=0}^m N_k(x-1)^k.$	4

This is an identity for two polynomials whose coefficients depend on ω, which is implicit in the notation.

Proof of (4) using (3): Substituting c_{n} = x^{n} for n ∈ {0, ..., m} into (3) and using the binomial formula shows that

$$\sum_{n=0}^m 1_{\{N=n\}}x^n
=\sum_{k=0}^m N_k\underbrace{\sum_{l=0}^k \binom kl(-1)^{k-l}x^l}_{=\,(x-1)^k},$$

which proves (4).

=== Representation with shift and difference operators ===
Consider the linear shift operator E and the linear difference operator Δ, which we define here on the sequence space of V by

$$\begin{align}
E:V^{\mathbb{N}_0}&\to V^{\mathbb{N}_0},\\
E(c_0,c_1,c_2,c_3,\ldots)&\mapsto(c_1,c_2,c_3,\ldots),\\
\end{align}$$

and

$$\begin{align}
\Delta:V^{\mathbb{N}_0}&\to V^{\mathbb{N}_0},\\
\Delta(c_0,c_1,c_2,c_3\ldots)&\mapsto(c_1-c_0,c_2-c_1,c_3-c_2,\ldots).\\
\end{align}$$

Substituting x = E in (4) shows that

$\sum_{n=0}^m 1_{\{N=n\}}E^n = \sum_{k=0}^m N_k\Delta^k,$	5

where we used that Δ = E – I with I denoting the identity operator. Note that E^{0} and Δ^{0} equal the identity operator I on the sequence space, E^{k} and Δ^{k} denote the k-fold composition.

Direct proof of (5) by the operator method

To prove (5), we first want to verify the equation

$\sum_{n=0}^m 1_{\{N=n\}}E^n=\prod_{j=1}^m(1_{A_j^{\mathrm c}}I+1_{A_j}E)$	✳

involving indicator functions of the sets A_{1}, ..., A_{m} and their complements with respect to Ω. Suppose an ω from Ω belongs to exactly k sets out of A_{1}, ..., A_{m}, where k ∈ {0, ..., m}, for simplicity of notation say that ω only belongs to A_{1}, ..., A_{k}. Then the left-hand side of (✳) is E^{k}. On the right-hand side of (✳), the first k factors equal E, the remaining ones equal I, their product is also E^{k}, hence the formula (✳) is true.

Note that

$$\begin{align}
1_{A_j^{\mathrm c}}I+1_{A_j}E
&=I-1_{A_j}I+1_{A_j}E\\
&=I+1_{A_j}(E-I)=I+1_{A_j}\Delta,\qquad j\in\{0,\ldots,m\}.
\end{align}$$

Inserting this result into equation (✳) and expanding the product gives

$$\sum_{n=0}^m 1_{\{N=n\}}E^n
=\sum_{k=0}^m\sum_{\scriptstyle J\subset\{1,\ldots,m\}\atop\scriptstyle|J|=k}
1_{\cap_{j\in J}A_j}\Delta^k,$$

because the product of indicator functions is the indicator function of the intersection. Using the definition (2), the result (5) follows.

Let (Δ^{k}c)_{0} denote the 0th component of the k-fold composition Δ^{k} applied to c = (c_{0}, c_{1}, ..., c_{m}, ...), where Δ^{0} denotes the identity. Then (3) can be rewritten in a more compact way as

$\sum_{n=0}^m 1_{\{N=n\}}c_n = \sum_{k=0}^m N_k(\Delta^k c)_0.$	6

== Probabilistic versions ==
Consider arbitrary events A_{1}, ..., A_{m} in a probability space (Ω, F, $\mathbb{P}$) and let E denote the expectation operator. Then N from (1) is the random number of these events which occur simultaneously. Using N_{k} from (2), define

$S_k=\mathbb{E}[N_k]=\sum_{\scriptstyle J\subset\{1,\ldots,m\}\atop\scriptstyle|J|=k} \mathbb{P}\biggl(\bigcap_{j\in J}A_j\biggr),\qquad k\in\{0,\ldots,m\},$	7

where the intersection over the empty index set is again defined as Ω, hence S_{0} = 1. If the ring R is also an algebra over the real or complex numbers, then taking the expectation of the coefficients in (4) and using the notation from (7),

$\sum_{n=0}^m \mathbb{P}(N=n)x^n = \sum_{k=0}^m S_k(x-1)^k$	4'

in R[x]. If R is the field of real numbers, then this is the probability-generating function of the probability distribution of N.

Similarly, (5) and (6) yield

$\sum_{n=0}^m \mathbb{P}(N=n)E^n=\sum_{k=0}^m S_k\Delta^k$	5'

and, for every sequence c = (c_{0}, c_{1}, c_{2}, c_{3}, ..., c_{m}, ...),

$\sum_{n=0}^m \mathbb{P}(N=n)\,c_n=\sum_{k=0}^m S_k\,(\Delta^kc)_0.$	6'

The quantity on the left-hand side of (6') is the expected value of c_{N}.

== Remarks ==
1. In actuarial science, the name Schuette–Nesbitt formula refers to equation (6'), where V denotes the set of real numbers.
2. The left-hand side of equation (5') is a convex combination of the powers of the shift operator E, it can be seen as the expected value of random operator E^{N}. Accordingly, the left-hand side of equation (6') is the expected value of random component c_{N}. Note that both have a discrete probability distribution with finite support, hence expectations are just the well-defined finite sums.
3. The probabilistic version of the inclusion–exclusion principle can be derived from equation (6') by choosing the sequence c = (0, 1, 1, ...): the left-hand side reduces to the probability of the event {N ≥ 1}, which is the union of A_{1}, ..., A_{m}, and the right-hand side is S_{1} – S_{2} + S_{3} – ... – (–1)^{m}S_{m}, because (Δ^{0}c)_{0} = 0 and (Δ^{k}c)_{0} = –(–1)^{k} for k ∈ {1, ..., m}.
4. Equations (5), (5'), (6) and (6') are also true when the shift operator and the difference operator are considered on a subspace like the ℓ^{p} spaces.
5. If desired, the formulae (5), (5'), (6) and (6') can be considered in finite dimensions, because only the first m + 1 components of the sequences matter. Hence, represent the linear shift operator E and the linear difference operator Δ as mappings of the (m + 1)-dimensional Euclidean space into itself, given by the (m + 1) × (m + 1)-matrices

$$E=\begin{pmatrix}
0&1&0&\cdots&0\\
0&0&1&\ddots&\vdots\\
\vdots&\ddots&\ddots&\ddots&0\\
0&\cdots&0&0&1\\
0&\cdots&0&0&0
\end{pmatrix},
\qquad
\Delta=\begin{pmatrix}
-1&1&0&\cdots&0\\
0&-1&1&\ddots&\vdots\\
\vdots&\ddots&\ddots&\ddots&0\\
0&\cdots&0&-1&1\\
0&\cdots&0&0&-1
\end{pmatrix},$$

and let I denote the (m + 1)-dimensional identity matrix. Then (6) and (6') hold for every vector c = (c_{0}, c_{1}, ..., c_{m})^{T} in (m + 1)-dimensional Euclidean space, where the exponent T in the definition of c denotes the transpose.

1. Equations (5) and (5') hold for an arbitrary linear operator E as long as Δ is the difference of E and the identity operator I.
2. The probabilistic versions (4'), (5') and (6') can be generalized to every finite measure space.

For textbook presentations of the probabilistic Schuette–Nesbitt formula (6') and their applications to actuarial science, cf. Gerber (1997). Chapter 8, or Bowers et al. (1997), Chapter 18 and the Appendix, pp. 577–578.

== History ==
For independent events, the formula (6') appeared in a discussion of Robert P. White and T.N.E. Greville's paper by Donald R. Schuette and Cecil J. Nesbitt, see Schuette & Nesbitt (1959). In the two-page note Gerber (1979), Hans U. Gerber, called it Schuette–Nesbitt formula and generalized it to arbitrary events. Christian Buchta, see Buchta (1994), noticed the combinatorial nature of the formula and published the elementary combinatorial proof of (3).

Cecil J. Nesbitt, PhD, F.S.A., M.A.A.A., received his mathematical education at the University of Toronto and the Institute for Advanced Study in Princeton. He taught actuarial mathematics at the University of Michigan from 1938 to 1980. He served the Society of Actuaries from 1985 to 1987 as Vice-President for Research and Studies. Professor Nesbitt died in 2001. (Short CV taken from Bowers et al. (1997), page xv.)

Donald Richard Schuette was a PhD student of C. Nesbitt, he later became professor at the University of Wisconsin–Madison.

The probabilistic version of the Schuette–Nesbitt formula (6') generalizes much older formulae of Waring, which express the probability of the events {N = n} and {N ≥ n} in terms of S_{1}, S_{2}, ..., S_{m}. More precisely, with $\textstyle\binom kn$ denoting the binomial coefficient,

$\mathbb{P}(N=n)=\sum_{k=n}^m(-1)^{k-n}\binom kn S_k, \qquad n\in\{0,\ldots,m\},$	8

and

$\mathbb{P}(N\ge n)=\sum_{k=n}^m(-1)^{k-n}\binom{k-1}{n-1}S_k,\qquad n\in\{1,\ldots,m\},$	9

see Feller (1968), Sections IV.3 and IV.5, respectively.

To see that these formulae are special cases of the probabilistic version of the Schuette–Nesbitt formula, note that by the binomial theorem

$$\Delta^k=(E-I)^k=\sum_{j=0}^k\binom kj (-1)^{k-j}E^j,\qquad k\in\mathbb{N}_0.$$

Applying this operator identity to the sequence c = (0, ..., 0, 1, 0, 0, ...) with n leading zeros and noting that (E^{j}c)_{0} = 1 if j = n and (E^{j}c)_{0} = 0 otherwise, the formula (8) for {N = n} follows from (6').

Applying the identity to c = (0, ..., 0, 1, 1, 1, ...) with n leading zeros and noting that (E^{j}c)_{0} = 1 if j ≥ n and (E^{j}c)_{0} = 0 otherwise, equation (6') implies that

$$\mathbb{P}(N\ge n)=\sum_{k=n}^m S_k\sum_{j=n}^k\binom kj(-1)^{k-j}.$$

Expanding (1 – 1)^{k} using the binomial theorem and using equation (11) of the formulas involving binomial coefficients, we obtain

$$\sum_{j=n}^k\binom kj(-1)^{k-j}
=-\sum_{j=0}^{n-1}\binom kj(-1)^{k-j}
=(-1)^{k-n}\binom{k-1}{n-1}.$$

Hence, we have the formula (9) for {N ≥ n}.

== Applications ==
=== In actuarial science ===
Problem: Suppose there are m persons aged x_{1}, ..., x_{m} with remaining random (but independent) lifetimes T_{1}, ..., T_{m}. Suppose the group signs a life insurance contract which pays them after t years the amount c_{n} if exactly n persons out of m are still alive after t years. How high is the expected payout of this insurance contract in t years?

Solution: Let A_{j} denote the event that person j survives t years, which means that A_{j} = {T_{j} > t}. In actuarial notation the probability of this event is denoted by _{t} p_{x_{j}} and can be taken from a life table. Use independence to calculate the probability of intersections. Calculate S_{1}, ..., S_{m} and use the probabilistic version of the Schuette–Nesbitt formula (6') to calculate the expected value of c_{N}.

=== In probability theory ===
Let σ be a random permutation of the set {1, ..., m} and let A_{j} denote the event that j is a fixed point of σ, meaning that A_{j} = {σ(j) = j}. When the numbers in J, which is a subset of {1, ..., m}, are fixed points, then there are (m – |J|)! ways to permute the remaining m – |J| numbers, hence

$$\mathbb{P}\biggl(\bigcap_{j\in J}A_j\biggr)=\frac{(m-|J|)!}{m!}.$$

By the combinatorical interpretation of the binomial coefficient, there are $\textstyle\binom mk$ different choices of a subset J of {1, ..., m} with k elements, hence (7) simplifies to

$$S_k=\binom mk \frac{(m-k)!}{m!}=\frac1{k!}.$$

Therefore, using (4'), the probability-generating function of the number N of fixed points is given by

$$\mathbb{E}[x^N]=\sum_{k=0}^m\frac{(x-1)^k}{k!},\qquad x\in\mathbb{R}.$$

This is the partial sum of the infinite series giving the exponential function at x – 1, which in turn is the probability-generating function of the Poisson distribution with parameter 1. Therefore, as m tends to infinity, the distribution of N converges to the Poisson distribution with parameter 1.

== See also ==
- Rencontres numbers
