= Werner Wolfgang Rogosinski =

Werner W. Rogosinski
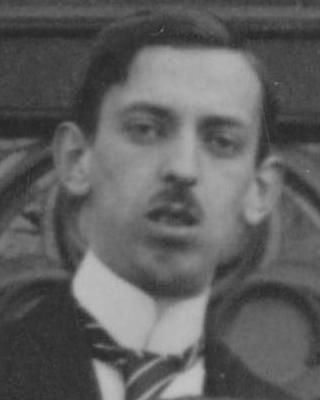
- Werner Wolfgang Rogosinski, 1920 at Göttingen
- Born: 24 September 1894; Breslau, German Empire
- Died: 23 July 1964 (aged 69); Aarhus, Denmark
- Education: University of Breslau; University of Freiburg; University of Göttingen
- Awards: Fellow of the Royal Society foreign member of the Royal Danish Academy of Sciences
- Scientific career
- Fields: mathematics
- Workplaces: Newcastle University
- Thesis: New Application of Pfeiffer's method for Dirichlet's divisor problem (1922)
- Doctoral advisor: Edmund Landau

Werner Wolfgang Rogosinski FRS (24 September 1894 – 23 July 1964) was a German (later British) mathematician.

== Life ==
Rogosinski was born into a Jewish family in Breslau, German Empire (now Wrocław, Poland). His father, Hermann Rogosinski was Counsel in Breslau. Rogosinski studied at Mary Magdalen School from 1900 until 1913. He attended the University of Breslau, University of Freiburg and University of Göttingen, with Edmund Landau. His studies were interrupted by World War I, in which Rogosinski served as a medic.

Rogosinski focused his studies on pure mathematics, physics and philosophy. His interest was analytical problems, especially in series. His dissertation, "New Application of Pfeiffer's method for Dirichlet's divisor problem", caused a stir in 1922.

== Career ==
In 1923, he first went to Koenigsberg as a lecturer, and became an associate professor in 1928. He worked with Richard Brauer, Gábor Szegő and Kurt Reidemeister for five years. Rogosinski and Szegő families became friends. His first book Fouriersche Reihen was published in 1930. It provided a student's introduction to the Fourier series. The original was translated into English in 1950 and is still used.

Rogosinski married in 1928 in Königsberg. In 1932, his son Peter was born. After the Nazi takeover, his fortunes changed. In 1936, his teaching credentials were withdrawn. He was allowed only in some Jewish schools in Berlin. The Cambridge professors G. H. Hardy and John Edensor Littlewood invited him to come to the United Kingdom. He moved with his wife and child to Cambridge in 1937, with support from the Society for the Protection of Science and Learning.

He published five papers with Hardy from 1943 to 1949, under the title Notes on Fourier series. In 1944 Rogisinski and Hardy published their book Fourier Series, which might be said to be a rewrite, using Lebesgue integral methods, of Rogosinski's 1930 book. He was a teacher in Aberdeen in 1941. In 1945, he became a lecturer at Newcastle University (prior to 1963, King's College, University of Durham). In 1947 he was appointed professor and in 1948 Head of Department.

In 1959, Rogosinski resigned his position at Newcastle. Svend Bundgaard brought him into the Mathematical Institute at Aarhus. In 1954, he was elected Fellow of the Royal Society. In 1962, he was elected a foreign member of the Royal Danish Academy of Sciences. His intention was to go to the new University of Sussex. He died after a long illness, aged 69, in Aarhus.
