= Brauer's three main theorems =

Three results in the representation theory of finite groups

Brauer's main theorems are three theorems in representation theory of finite groups linking the blocks of a finite group (in characteristic p) with those of its p-local subgroups, that is to say, the normalizers of its nontrivial p-subgroups.

The second and third main theorems allow refinements of orthogonality relations for ordinary characters which may be applied in finite group theory. These do not presently admit a proof purely in terms of ordinary characters. All three main theorems are stated in terms of the Brauer correspondence.

== Brauer correspondence ==
There are many ways to extend the definition which follows, but this is close to the early treatments by Brauer. Let G be a finite group, p be a prime, F be a field of characteristic p. Let H be a subgroup of G which contains

$$QC_G(Q)$$

for some p-subgroup Q of G, and is contained in the normalizer

$$N_G(Q)$$,

where $C_G(Q)$ is the centralizer of Q in G.

The Brauer homomorphism (with respect to H) is a linear map from the center of the group algebra of G over F to the corresponding algebra for H. Specifically, it is the restriction to $Z(FG)$ of the (linear) projection from $FG$ to $FC_G(Q)$ whose kernel is spanned by the elements of G outside $C_G(Q)$. The image of this map is contained in $Z(FH)$, and it transpires that the map is also a ring homomorphism.

Since it is a ring homomorphism, for any block B of FG, the Brauer homomorphism sends the identity element of B to an idempotent element (possibly to 0). If the idempotent is non-zero, it may be decomposed as a sum of (mutually orthogonal) primitive idempotents of Z(FH). Each of these primitive idempotents is the multiplicative identity of some block of FH. The block b of FH is said to be a Brauer correspondent of B if its identity element occurs in this decomposition of the image of the identity of B under the Brauer homomorphism.

== Brauer's first main theorem ==
Brauer's first main theorem (Brauer 1944, 1956, 1970) states that if $G$ is a finite group and $D$ is a $p$-subgroup of $G$, then there is a bijection between the set of (characteristic p) blocks of $G$ with defect group $D$ and blocks of the normalizer $N_G(D)$ with defect group D. This bijection arises because when $H = N_G(D)$, each block of G with defect group D has a unique Brauer correspondent block of H, which also has defect group D.

== Brauer's second main theorem ==
Brauer's second main theorem (Brauer 1944, 1959) gives, for an element t whose order is a power of a prime p, a criterion for a (characteristic p) block of $C_G(t)$ to correspond to a given block of $G$, via generalized decomposition numbers. These are the coefficients which occur when the restrictions of ordinary characters of $G$ (from the given block) to elements of the form tu, where u ranges over elements of order prime to p in $C_G(t)$, are written as linear combinations of the irreducible Brauer characters of $C_G(t)$. The content of the theorem is that it is only necessary to use Brauer characters from blocks of $C_G(t)$ which are Brauer correspondents of the chosen block of G.

== Brauer's third main theorem ==
Brauer's third main theorem (Brauer 1964, theorem3) states that when Q is a p-subgroup of the finite group G, and H is a subgroup of G containing $QC_G(Q)$ and contained in $N_G(Q)$, then the principal block of H is the only Brauer correspondent of the principal block of G (where the blocks referred to are calculated in characteristic p).

== See also ==
- Brauer's height zero conjecture
- Brauer algebra
- Richard Brauer
