= Decomposition matrix =

In mathematics, and in particular modular representation theory, a decomposition matrix is a matrix that results from writing the irreducible ordinary characters in terms of the irreducible modular characters, where the entries of the two sets of characters are taken to be over all conjugacy classes of elements of order coprime to the characteristic of the field. All such entries in the matrix are non-negative integers. The decomposition matrix, multiplied by its transpose, forms the Cartan matrix, listing the composition factors of the projective modules.

== See also ==
- Matrix decomposition
