= Donald S. Passman =

American mathematician

Donald Steven Passman (born March 28, 1940, in New York City) is an American mathematician, specializing in ring theory, group theory, and Lie algebra theory.

== Biography ==
After attending the Bronx High School of Science, Passman matriculated at the Polytechnic Institute of Brooklyn, where he graduated with B.S. in 1960. He then became a graduate student in mathematics at Harvard University, where he graduated with M.A. in 1961 and Ph.D. in 1964. His doctoral dissertation was written under the supervision of Richard Brauer. Passman was an assistant professor from 1964 to 1966 at the University of California, Los Angeles (U.C.L.A.) and from 1966 to 1969 at Yale University. At the University of Wisconsin–Madison, he was from 1969 to 1971 an associate professor, from 1971 to 1995 a full professor, and from 1995 to 2011 the Richard Brauer Professor of Mathematics. In 2011 he retired as professor emeritus.

Passman has written 7 books and more than 180 research publications. He has given over 70 invited addresses, not only in North America but also in Europe, Brazil, Israel, and Turkey. He has been an editor for several mathematical journals, including the International Journal of Mathematics, Game Theory and Algebra (1991–2013), Beiträge zur Algebra und Geometrie (1993–2013), Algebras and Representation Theory (2001–2011), and the Journal of Algebra and its Applications (2001–2016).

His research interests include finite and infinite groups, noncommutative ring theory, group rings and enveloping algebras of Lie algebras.

In 1963 Passman married Marjorie Mednick. They have two children, Barbara and Jonathan, and five grandchildren, Samuel, Rebecca, Abraham, Jordan and Eve.

== Awards and honors ==
- 1977 — Lester R. Ford Award for 1976 article What is a group ring?
- 1989 — Plenary speaker, Canadian Math Society summer meeting, Windsor Ontario, June 1989
- 2000 — Deborah and Franklin Haimo Award for Distinguished College or University Teaching of Mathematics, Mathematical Association of America
- 2005 — Conference, held June 10–12 2005 at the University of Wisconsin–Madison, in honor of Donald S. Passman
- 2012 — elected a 2013 Fellow of the American Mathematical Society

== Books ==
- Permutation Groups, Benjamin, New York, (1968), pbk edition, Dover, Mineola, (2012).
- Infinite Group Rings, Marcel Dekker, New York, (1971).
- The Algebraic Structure of Group Rings, Wiley-Interscience, New York (1977), [Krieger, Malabar, (1985)], pbk edition, Dover, Mineola, (2011).
- Group rings, Crossed Products and Galois Theory, CBMS Conference Notes, AMS, Providence, 1986.
- Infinite Crossed Products, Academic Press, Boston, (1989), pbk edition, Dover, Mineola, (2013).
- A Course in Ring Theory, Wadsworth, Pacific Grove, (1991), pbk edition, Chelsea-AMS, Providence, (2004).
- Lectures on Linear Algebra, World Scientific, Singapore, (2022),
