= Ralph Gordon Stanton =

Canadian mathematician (1923–2010)

- Born: October 21, 1923; Lambeth, Ontario, Canada
- Died: April 21, 2010 (aged 86)
- Education: University of Western Ontario; University of Toronto
- Scientific career
- Fields: Mathematics

Ralph Gordon Stanton (21 October 1923 – 21 April 2010) was a Canadian mathematician, teacher, scholar, and pioneer in mathematics and computing education. As a researcher, he made important contributions in the area of discrete mathematics; and as an educator and administrator, was also instrumental in founding the Faculty of Mathematics at the University of Waterloo, and for establishing its unofficial mascot of the pink tie.

== Life and education ==
Stanton was born in Lambeth, Ontario, Canada on 21 October 1923. He was the eldest of four children.

Stanton received his BA in Mathematics and Physics in 1944 from the University of Western Ontario. He went on to receive his MA in 1945 and PhD in 1948, both from the University of Toronto. His PhD dissertation was on the topic "On The Mathiew Group M(Sub 24)", under advisor Richard Dagobert Brauer. He received honorary Doctor of Science degrees from the University of Queensland in 1989, and from the University of Natal in 1997. He also received an honorary D. Math from the University of Waterloo in 1997.

== Career ==
=== Faculty positions ===
From 1946 to 1957 Stanton taught at the University of Toronto. In 1957, he moved to Kitchener-Waterloo to work at what was then Waterloo College, which was undergoing expansion, and became what is currently the University of Waterloo. At the time of his arrival he constituted the entirety of the Mathematics Department. Stanton became the university's first Dean of Graduate Studies in 1960. He turned the Department of Mathematics into the Faculty of Mathematics, which when it opened on January 1, 1967 was the first of its kind in North America. In 1967 he moved to York University to found their Graduate program in Mathematics. In 1970 he moved to the University of Manitoba's Department of Computer Science, serving successively as Head, Professor, and Distinguished Professor.

=== Research ===
Stanton's main areas of research were in statistics and applied statistics; algebra; mathematical biology; combinatorial design theory, including pair-wise balanced designs, difference sets, covering and packing designs, and room squares; graph theory, including graph models of networks; and algorithms.

== Teaching and other influences ==
Stanton's influence on the young University of Waterloo extended to many areas. He hired Wes Graham, who Stanton had taught as an undergraduate. Graham became one of the first professors of computer science at the university, and the first Director of its Computing Centre in 1962. Stanton was one of five members of the Academic Advisory Committee that, in 1958, urged the board of governors to buy the Schweitzer farm on the outskirts of Waterloo that today houses the main campus. He introduced computers to classroom teaching in 1960, and introduced co-op programs in applied mathematics and computer science.

His interest in teaching extended to the secondary school level. He encouraged teaching of computing science and mathematics in high schools, serving as editor of two high school mathematical journals, member of Ontario provincial curriculum committees, and was actively involved in developing the Canadian Junior Mathematics Contest and the Descartes Senior Mathematics Competition, now administered by the University of Waterloo's Centre for Education in Mathematics and Computing.

Stanton's gaudy neckties were the inspiration for the University of Waterloo's Faculty of Mathematics mascot, a giant pink tie that was hung by students over the Math and Computer Building when it opened in 1968. The pink tie remains the unofficial symbol of the Mathematics Faculty, with the Mathematics Society distributing more than 1000 pink ties to new students in the first week of the school year.

Stanton founded and administered three not-for-profit corporations dedicated to mathematical research and communication. "Utilitas Mathematica Publishing" started in the 1970s and published conference proceedings in mathematics and scientific computing. He founded the Charles Babbage Research Centre (CBRC), a registered charitable organization, to promote conferences and encourage the publication of research. The CBRC currently has published the Canadian journal of combinatorics, Ars Combinatoria, since its inception in 1976, and continues to publish six volumes per year. In 1990 he began his final project, the Institute of Combinatorics and its Applications (ICA). Although the institute was minimally active after Stanton's death in 2010, in March 2016 it resumed its full activities. Stanton also helped organize the first Southeastern Conference on Combinatorics, Graph Theory, and Computing. He continued as one of the organizers until at least 1991, at which point it was the largest combinatorial meeting in the world.

== Awards ==
In 1985 he was awarded the Killam Prize in Mathematics for Natural Sciences from the Canada Council for the Arts. (As of 2017, five prizes of $100,000 Cdn are awarded annually.)

== Literature collection ==
Stanton's collection of French and Portuguese literature was described as one of the world's largest private collections of classical Portuguese literature. He donated his collection to the Fisher Rare Book Library at the University of Toronto. His donations spanned from 1987 to his death in 2010, with the bulk being donated in the 1990s. Thanks to his generosity, the Fisher Rare Book Library now "boasts comprehensive collections of most of the significant French playwrights of the Classical period". An example of his donations is a two-volume set of the 1587 edition of Holinshed's Chronicles.
