= Karin Erdmann =

German mathematician (born 1948)

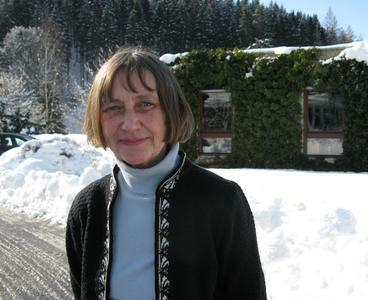
Erdmann at Oberwolfach in 2009

Karin Erdmann (born 1948) is a German mathematician specializing in the areas of algebra known as representation theory (especially modular representation theory) and homological algebra (especially Hochschild cohomology). She is notable for her work in modular representation theory which has been cited over 1500 times according to the Mathematical Reviews. Her nephew Martin Erdmann is professor for experimental particle physics at the RWTH Aachen University.

== Education ==
She attended the Justus-Liebig-Universität Gießen and wrote her Ph.D. thesis on "2-Hauptblöcke von Gruppen mit Dieder-Gruppen als 2-Sylow-Gruppen" (Principal 2-blocks of groups with dihedral Sylow 2-subgroups) in 1976 under the direction of Gerhard O. Michler.

== Professional career ==
Erdmann was a Fellow of Somerville College, Oxford. Erdmann is a university lecturer emeritus at the Mathematical Institute at the University of Oxford where she has had 25 doctoral students and 45 descendants. She has published over 115 papers and her work has been cited over 2000 times. She has contributed to the understanding of the representation theory of the symmetric group.

== Honors ==
Erdmann was the inaugural Emmy Noether Lecturer of the German Mathematical Society in 2008.

== Selected bibliography ==
- Erdmann, Karin; Wildon, Mark J. (2006), Introduction to Lie algebras, Springer Undergraduate Mathematics Series, London: Springer-Verlag London Ltd., doi:10.1007/1-84628-490-2, ISBN 978-1-84628-040-5, MR 2218355
- Erdmann, Karin (1990), Blocks of Tame Representation Type and Related Algebras, Lecture Notes in Mathematics, vol. 1428, Berlin, New York: Springer-Verlag, doi:10.1007/BFb0084003, ISBN 978-3-540-52709-1, MR 1064107
