= Cryptomathic =

Cryptography company

CRYPTOMAThIC
- Company type: Limited liability company
- Founded: 1986
- Headquarters: Aarhus, Denmark
- Key people: Peter Landrock, Founder and executive chairman
- Products: Public key infrastructure Software Suite; advanced key management system; Strong authentication solution; data preparation software and management of cryptographic resources
- Number of employees: ~ 100 (2023)
- Website: www.cryptomathic.com

Cryptomathic is a software company specializing in the area of cryptography for e-commerce security systems. The company develops secure software for the financial and governmental industries. It focuses especially on developing back-end solutions using hardware security modules.

Cryptomathic has its headquarters in Aarhus, Denmark. The company was founded in 1986, by three professors from University of Aarhus, among them Peter Landrock and Ivan Damgård. It now operates world-wide with offices in London, UK; Munich, Germany and San Jose, California, US

Cryptomathic has collaborated in research projects with the Isaac Newton Institute for Mathematical Sciences to develop Cryptomathic's systems for securing messaging between hardware security modules (HSMs). With Bristol University, Cryptomathic conducted research on authenticated encryption between HSMs.

== Awards and recognition ==
In 2002, Cryptomathic's chief cryptographer Vincent Rijmen was named one of the top 100 innovators in the world under the age of 35 by the MIT Technology Review TR100.

In 2003, Cryptomathic was recognized by the World Economic Forum as a Technology Pioneer, based on its innovative product for mobile electronic signatures. The term "What You See Is What You Sign" (WYSIWYS) was coined in 1998 by Peter Landrock and Torben Pedersen of Cryptomathic during their work on delivering secure and legally binding digital signatures for Pan-European projects. In 2004, Cryptomathic received the Visa Smart Star Award for it contributions to the field of EMV and Chip and PIN based on its data preparation offering. In 2010, Cryptomathic's founder, Peter Landrock was named a Finalist for European Inventor 2010 in the "Lifetime Achievement" category by the European Patent Office.

The member of Cryptomathic's advisory board, Whitfield Diffie is co-author of the Diffie–Hellman key exchange, a method of securely exchanging cryptographic keys. Diffie and Hellman were awarded with the 2015 Turing Award for "fundamental contributions to modern cryptography" including public-key cryptography and digital signatures.
