= Cecil J. Nesbitt =

Canadian mathematician (1912–2001)

Cecil James Nesbitt, Ph.D., F.S.A., M.A.A.A. (1912–2001) was a mathematician who was a Ph.D. student of Richard Brauer and wrote many influential papers in the early history of modular representation theory.

Nesbitt taught actuarial mathematics at the University of Michigan from 1938 to 1980. Nesbitt was born in Ontario, Canada. He received his mathematical education at the University of Toronto and the Institute for Advanced Study in Princeton. He served the Society of Actuaries from 1985 to 1987 as Vice-President for Research and Studies. He developed the Schuette–Nesbitt formula with Donald R. Schuette.

== Selected publications ==
- with Richard Brauer: On the modular representations of groups of finite order. University of Toronto studies. 1937.
- with Emil Artin and Robert M. Thrall: Rings with minimum condition. No. 1. Ann Arbor: University of Michigan Press. 1944.
- with R. M. Thrall: "Some ring theorems with applications to modular representations". Annals of Mathematics. 47: 551–567. 1946. doi:10.2307/1969092.
- with George H. Andrews: "Periodograms of graduation operators". Transactions of the Society of Actuaries. 17: 166–177. 1965.
- with J. J. McCutcheon: "Actuarial Note: Further remarks on the basic mortality functions". Transactions of the Faculty of Actuaries. 33 (238): 81–91. 1971. JSTOR 41218645.
- with Newton L. Bowers and James C. Hickman: "Notes on the dynamics of pension funding" (PDF). Insurance: Mathematics and Economics. 1 (4): 261–270. 1982. doi:10.1016/0167-6687(82)90026-9. hdl:2027.42/23851.
- "Personal reflections on actuarial science in North America from 1900". A Century of Mathematics in America, Part III. 1989. pp. 617–38.
- with Marjorie V. Butcher: Mathematics of Compound Interest. Ulrichs Books. 1971.

== See also ==
- Schuette–Nesbitt formula
