= Brauer–Fowler theorem =

Theorem about finite groups

In mathematics, specifically group theory, the Brauer–Fowler theorem, proved by Richard Brauer and K. A. Fowler, states that if a finite group G has even order g > 2 then it has a proper subgroup of order greater than g^{1/3}. The technique of the proof is to count involutions (elements of order 2) in G.

Perhaps more important is another result that the authors derive from the same count of involutions, namely that up to isomorphism there are only a finite number of finite simple groups with a given centralizer of an involution. This suggested that finite simple groups could be classified by studying their centralizers of involutions, and it led to the discovery of several sporadic groups. This later motivated a part of the classification of finite simple groups.
