= Brauer–Suzuki theorem =

In mathematics, the Brauer–Suzuki theorem, proved by Brauer & Suzuki (1959), Suzuki (1962), Brauer (1964), states that if a finite group has a generalized quaternion Sylow 2-subgroup and no non-trivial normal subgroups of odd order, then the group has a center of order 2. In particular, such a group cannot be simple.

A generalization of the Brauer–Suzuki theorem is given by Glauberman's Z* theorem.
