= Forum of Mathematics =

Forum of Mathematics, Pi
- Discipline: Mathematics
- Language: English
- Edited by: Robert Guralnick

Publication details
- History: 2012–present
- Publisher: Cambridge University Press
- Open access: Open (gold)

Standard abbreviations
- ISO 4: Forum Math. Pi

Indexing
- ISSN: 2050-5086
- OCLC no.: 847482162

Links
- Journal homepage

Forum of Mathematics, Sigma
- Discipline: Mathematics
- Language: English
- Edited by: Robert Guralnick

Publication details
- History: 2012–present
- Publisher: Cambridge University Press
- Open access: Open (gold)

Standard abbreviations
- ISO 4: Forum Math. Sigma

Indexing
- ISSN: 2050-5094
- OCLC no.: 1010677950

Links
- Journal homepage

Forum of Mathematics, Pi and Forum of Mathematics, Sigma are open-access peer-reviewed journals for mathematics published under a creative commons license by Cambridge University Press. The founding managing editor was Rob Kirby. He was succeeded by Robert Guralnick, who is currently the managing editor of both journals.

Forum of Mathematics, Pi publishes articles of interest to a wide audience of mathematicians, while Forum of Mathematics, Sigma is intended for more specialized articles, with clusters of editors in different areas of mathematics.

== Abstracting and indexing ==
Both journals are abstracted and indexed in Science Citation Index Expanded, MathSciNet, and Scopus.
