= Ivan Damgård =

Danish cryptographer (born 1956)

Ivan Bjerre Damgård
- Born: April 17, 1956 (age 70); Svendborg, Denmark
- Education: Aarhus University
- Known for: Merkle–Damgård construction; Damgård–Jurik cryptosystem
- Awards: IACR Fellow (2010); STOC Test of Time Award (2021)
- Scientific career
- Fields: Cryptography
- Workplaces: Department of Computer Science, Aarhus University
- Thesis: Multiparty unconditionally secure protocols (1988)
- Doctoral advisor: Peter Landrock
- Doctoral students: Lars Knudsen; Ronald Cramer

Ivan Bjerre Damgård (born 1956) is a Danish cryptographer and currently a professor at the Department of Computer Science, Aarhus University, Denmark. Ivan is the co-founder of Cryptomathic, Partisia and Sepior. Ivan is a Professor and head of the research group in cryptography at Aarhus University. He is one of the top cited and publishing researchers in cryptography, is a fellow of the IACR (International Association for Cryptologic Research), and received the 2015 RSA Award for Excellence in the Field of Mathematics.

== Academic background ==
In 1983, he obtained a master's degree in mathematics (with minors in music and computer science) at Aarhus University. He began his PhD studies in 1985, at the same university, and was for a period, a guest researcher at CWI in Amsterdam in 1987. He earned his PhD degree in May, 1988, with the thesis Ubetinget beskyttelse i kryptografiske protokoller (Unconditional protection in cryptographic protocols) and has been employed at Aarhus University ever since. Damgård became full professor in 2005.

== Research ==
Damgård co-invented the Merkle–Damgård construction, which is used in influential cryptographic hash functions such as SHA-2, SHA-1 and MD5. He discovered the structure independently of Ralph Merkle and published it in 1989.

Ivan Damgård is one of the founders of the Cryptomathic company. In 2010, he was selected as IACR Fellow.

In 2020, he received the Public Key Cryptography (PKC) conference Test of Time Award for the paper "A Generalisation, a Simplification and Some Applications of Paillier's Probabilistic Public-Key System", which was published in PKC 2001 by Damgård and Jurik.

In 2021, Damgård received the ACM Symposium on Theory of Computing (STOC) Test of Time Award for the paper "Multiparty unconditionally secure protocols", which was published in STOC 1988 by Chaum, Crépeau, and Damgård.
