= Sylow =

Sylow is a surname that originates in Denmark. Notable people with the surname include:

== People ==
- Peter Ludvig Sylow (1832–1918), Norwegian mathematician
- Ludvig Sylow (DBU) (1861–1933), Danish football executive
- Arnoldus von Westen Sylow Koren (1764–1854), Norwegian civil servant and district judge
- Thomas Edvard von Westen Sylow (1792–1875), Norwegian Minister of the Army

== Other uses ==
- Sylow theorems, a collection of theorems named after the Norwegian mathematician Peter Ludwig Sylow
- Sylow subgroups of the symmetric groups are important examples of p-groups
- Sylow-Tournament, a knockout football competition contested annually between 1918 and 1926
