= Edward Everett Dale =

American historian

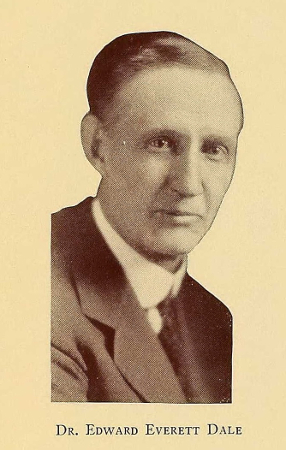
- Edward Everett Dale, circa 1924
- Born: February 8, 1879; Keller, Texas, United States
- Died: May 28, 1972 (aged 93); Norman, Oklahoma
- Occupations: Professor, Historian
- Writing career
- Genres: History of Oklahoma, American History

Edward Everett Dale (February 8, 1879 – May 28, 1972) was an American historian and longtime faculty member of the University of Oklahoma. He was a proponent of Frederick Jackson Turner's "frontier thesis" and is known as a major influence on the historian Angie Debo.

== Biography ==
Dale was born on February 8, 1879, in a rural area called "Cross Timbers" near Keller, Tarrant County, Texas. Later his father had a farm in Greer County, Texas, where Dale lived in his youth. His mother died when he was five which left his father and an older brother to raise him. In 1892 the family relocated to Greer County, Texas. In 1896 Greer County became part of the Indian Territories (to become later, Oklahoma ) when the United States Supreme Court resolved a land dispute between Texas and Oklahoma over their common boundary. (Greer County's transfer from Texas to Oklahoma dramatically changed the course of Dale's life as later his first choice where to get a college education was now Oklahoma schools instead of those in Texas. ) Dale's early schooling was irregular. After his last attendance in grade school he was urged to sit for an examination that would award him a common school diploma. Attendance at a summer Normal Institute sponsored by Washita County gave him a certificate to teach school with the goal of earning money to buy calves for the ranch he and brother were trying to establish. After serving as schoolmaster at Cloud Chief and other small towns in the region he found that teaching agreed with him so he attended the Central Normal School at Edmond to strengthen his teaching credentials. A combination of summer sessions at the University of Oklahoma and later as full-time student gave him enough credits to graduate from the University of Oklahoma in 1911. Following a position as Superintendent of Schools in Blair, 1911–13, he decided a career at that level was not what he wanted. However, in order to teach at the college level he would need to go to graduate school; thus at age 33 he applied for a scholarship to Harvard. A year at Harvard University earned him a master's degree in 1914 which was followed in 1922 by a doctorate from Harvard where Frederick Jackson Turner served as his thesis advisor. He started as an assistant professor of history at the University of Oklahoma in 1914 and remained there (except for two stints at Harvard, 1916−17 and 1919−20, working on his dissertation) until his retirement in 1952 as emeritus research professor.

== Historical theories ==
Dale's thesis of Oklahoma history was that the succession of migrants (traders, military, ranchers, then pioneer farmers) moving westward over time had created a new, uniquely American society that had moved away from European influence. Oklahoma, where settlers incorporated the remnants of both the indigenous Native American tribes and the so-called "Five civilized tribes" that had been forcibly resettled from the Southeastern United States, developed a particularly unique unwritten law he called "Cow Custom", that later became embedded in the state's legal code and institutions.

== Mentorship of Angie Debo ==
Angie Debo enrolled in a class Dale taught at the University of Oklahoma on American history and government in 1916, and again in January 1917. Debo described him as having a "cowboy walk" and "soft voice". Dale taught her formal methods of recording and writing about history that she would use throughout her life. He considered her his "outstanding student" and considered himself her "academic godfather".

Debo became disillusioned with Dale in 1937 when he ignored her request to be considered as a replacement for historian Morris Wardell, who was leaving the university for a position at the University of Chicago. The university later hired male faculty members who were less qualified or accomplished than Debo, and refused to publish Debo's seminal first book about Indian relations in Oklahoma, And Still the Waters Run, later published by the Princeton University Press. Dale was not especially misogynist for his era, and both his reluctance to hire her as a colleague and the university's decision to reject the book arose not only from the pervasive discrimination against women academics at the time but also her "blunt" confrontational academic approach and the "explosive" nature of her research. Despite remaining cordial, Debo carried a resentment over these incidents until her death in 1989.

== Works ==
Of the eighteen books Dale wrote, Murrah considers five of them to be outstanding. They are:Range Cattle Industry(1930), Cow Country (1942), Frontier Ways (1959),Cross Timbers (1966), and Indians of the Southwest (1949). A short list of Dale's work relating to the Southwest is given by W. Eugene Hollon. Several of his articles have been collected in Frontier Ways and Frontier History. In addition to his historical writing, Dale wrote two reminiscences, Cross Timbers, Memories of a North Texas Boyood and West Wind Blows. A full bibliography detailing books, edited books and over sixty articles and essays written by Dale was done by Hicks. In 1957, after Dale's retirement, the University of Oklahoma named a new office and classroom building in honor of Dale. The History Department at the University of Oklahoma is still housed there.
