= I. Martin Isaacs =

American mathematician (1940–2025)

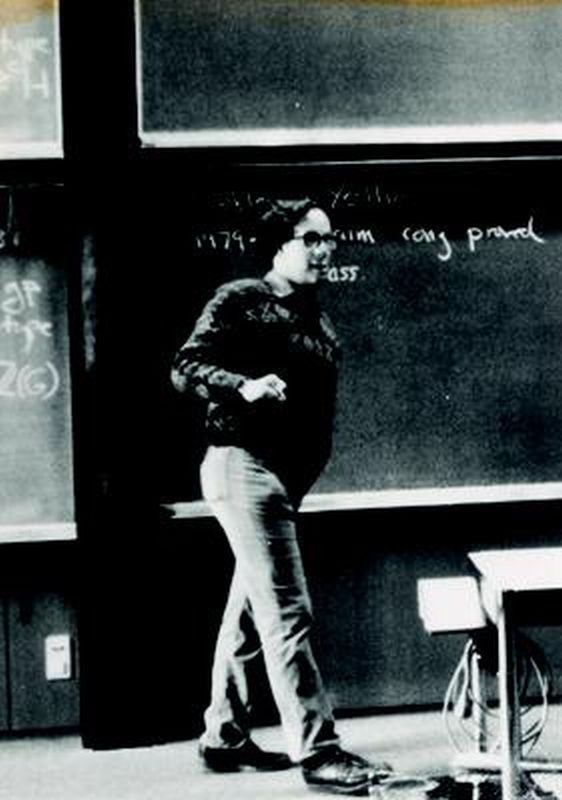
- Born: April 14, 1940
- Died: February 17, 2025 (aged 84)
- Scientific career
- Fields: Group theory, mathematics
- Workplaces: University of Chicago; University of Wisconsin–Madison

Irving Martin Isaacs (April 14, 1940 – February 17, 2025) was an American group theorist and representation theorist. He was a professor of mathematics at the University of Wisconsin–Madison.

== Biography ==
Isaacs was born in the Bronx, in New York City, on April 14, 1940. He received a BS from the Polytechnic Institute of Brooklyn in 1960. While a student there, he was named a Putnam Fellow for his performance in the 1959 William Lowell Putnam Mathematical Competition.

Isaacs went on to Harvard University for graduate study. He received a master's degree in 1961, and completed his PhD in 1964. His thesis was advised by Richard Brauer, and was titled Finite $p$-solvable linear groups. After a few years at the University of Chicago as an instructor and visiting assistant professor, Isaacs moved to the University of Wisconsin–Madison in 1969. He was hired as an associate professor, and promoted to full professor in 1971. According to the Mathematics Genealogy Project, he supervised 29 doctoral students over his career.

In 2011, Isaacs retired and became a professor emeritus. In retirement, he lived in Berkeley, California and was an occasional participant on MathOverflow. Near the end of his life, he endowed a prize for "Excellence in Mathematical Writing," first awarded in 2025.

== Work ==
Isaacs is known as the author of graduate-level textbooks on character theory and group theory. His book Character Theory of Finite Groups has been described as a classic in the field.

Isaacs is also known for formulating the Isaacs–Navarro conjecture along with Gabriel Navarro, a widely cited generalization of the McKay conjecture.

== Personal life ==
Isaacs was seriously injured in an automobile accident in France in 1964, shortly after receiving his PhD. The accident left him scarred and disabled.

He died of kidney failure on February 17, 2025.

== Awards and honors ==
In 2009, a conference was held at the Universitat de Valencia in Spain to honor his contributions. Following the conference, a festschrift was published by the American Mathematical Society.

Isaacs was the recipient of a Sloan Foundation research award in 1971. He was inaugurated as a Fellow of the American Mathematical Society in 2013.

Isaacs was a Pólya lecturer for the Mathematical Association of America between 2003 and 2005.

== Books ==
- Isaacs, I. Martin (1976). Character Theory of Finite Groups. Academic Press. ISBN 0123745500. (reprinted by Dover Publications in 1994, reprinted by the American Mathematical Society in 2006 ISBN 0821842293)
- Isaacs, I. Martin (1994). Algebra: A Graduate Course. Brooks Cole. ISBN 0534190022. (reprinted by the American Mathematical Society in 2009 ISBN 0821847996)
- Isaacs, I. Martin (2001). Geometry for College Students. Pure and Applied Mathematics 8. Brooks Cole. ISBN 0534351794. (reprinted by the American Mathematical Society in 2009 ISBN 0821847945)
- Isaacs, I. Martin (2008). Finite Group Theory. American Mathematical Society. ISBN 0821843443. 2011 reprint with corrections
- Isaacs, I. Martin (2018). Characters of Solvable Groups. American Mathematical Society. ISBN 9781470434854.
