= Radha Kessar =

Indian mathematician

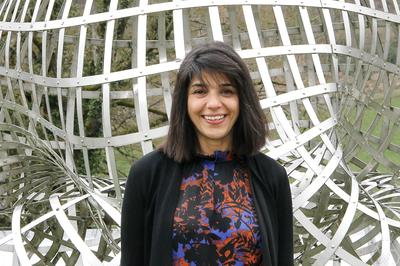
Kessar at Oberwolfach in 2019

Radha Kessar is an Indian mathematician known for her research in the representation theory of finite groups. She holds the Fielden Chair in Pure Mathematics at the University of Manchester, and in 2009 won the Berwick Prize of the London Mathematical Society.

== Education and career ==
Kessar graduated from Panjab University in 1991. She completed her Ph.D. in 1995 from Ohio State University; her dissertation, Blocks And Source Algebras For The Double Covers Of The Symmetric Groups, was supervised by Ronald Solomon.

After taking visiting assistant professor positions at Yale University and the University of Minnesota, and working as a Weir Junior Research Fellow at University College, Oxford, she returned to Ohio State as an assistant professor in 2002. She moved to the University of Aberdeen in 2005, to City, University of London in 2012, and then to the University of Manchester in 2022.

== Book ==
With Michael Aschbacher and Bob Oliver, she is an author of the book Fusion Systems in Algebra and Topology (Cambridge University Press, 2011).

== Recognition ==
Her 2009 Berwick award was joint with her future City colleague Joseph Chuang, for the research reported in their paper Symmetric Groups, Wreath Products, Morita Equivalences and Broué's Abelian Defect Conjecture. She was named MSRI Simons Professor for 2017-2018.
