= Z* theorem =

In mathematics, George Glauberman's Z* theorem is stated as follows:

Z* theorem: Let G be a finite group, with O(G) being its maximal normal subgroup of odd order. If T is a Sylow 2-subgroup of G containing an involution not conjugate in G to any other element of T, then the involution lies in Z*(G), which is the inverse image in G of the center of G/O(G).

This generalizes the Brauer–Suzuki theorem (and the proof uses the Brauer–Suzuki theorem to deal with some small cases).

== Details ==
The original paper Glauberman (1966) gave several criteria for an element to lie outside Z*(G). Its theorem 4 states:

For an element t in T, it is necessary and sufficient for t to lie outside Z*(G) that there is some g in G and abelian subgroup U of T satisfying the following properties:

1. g normalizes both U and the centralizer C_{T}(U), that is g is contained in N = N_{G}(U) ∩ N_{G}(C_{T}(U))
2. t is contained in U and tg ≠ gt
3. U is generated by the N-conjugates of t
4. the exponent of U is equal to the order of t

Moreover g may be chosen to have prime power order if t is in the center of T, and g may be chosen in T otherwise.

A simple corollary is that an element t in T is not in Z*(G) if and only if there is some s ≠ t such that s and t commute and s and t are G-conjugate.

A generalization to odd primes was recorded in Guralnick & Robinson (1993): if t is an element of prime order p and the commutator [t, g] has order coprime to p for all g, then t is central modulo the p′-core. This was also generalized to odd primes and to compact Lie groups in Mislin & Thévenaz (1991), which also contains several useful results in the finite case.

Henke & Semeraro (2015) have also studied an extension of the Z* theorem to pairs of groups (G, H) with H a normal subgroup of G.

== Works cited ==
- Dade, Everett C. (1971), "Character theory pertaining to finite simple groups", in Powell, M. B.; Higman, Graham (eds.), Finite simple groups. Proceedings of an Instructional Conference organized by the London Mathematical Society (a NATO Advanced Study Institute), Oxford, September 1969, Boston, MA: Academic Press, pp. 249–327, ISBN 978-0-12-563850-0, MR 0360785 gives a detailed proof of the Brauer–Suzuki theorem.
- Glauberman, George (1966), "Central elements in core-free groups", Journal of Algebra, 4 (3): 403–420, doi:10.1016/0021-8693(66)90030-5, ISSN 0021-8693, MR 0202822, Zbl 0145.02802
- Guralnick, Robert M.; Robinson, Geoffrey R. (1993), "On extensions of the Baer-Suzuki theorem", Israel Journal of Mathematics, 82 (1): 281–297, doi:10.1007/BF02808114, ISSN 0021-2172, MR 1239051, Zbl 0794.20029
- Henke, Ellen; Semeraro, Jason (1 October 2015). "Centralizers of normal subgroups and the Z*-theorem". Journal of Algebra. 439: 511–514. arXiv:1411.1932. doi:10.1016/j.jalgebra.2015.06.027.
- Mislin, Guido; Thévenaz, Jacques (1991), "The Z*-theorem for compact Lie groups", Mathematische Annalen, 291 (1): 103–111, doi:10.1007/BF01445193, ISSN 0025-5831, MR 1125010
