= George Glauberman =

American mathematician (born 1941)

- Born: George Isaac Glauberman; March 3, 1941 (age 85); New York City, New York, US

Academic background
- Education: Polytechnic Institute of Brooklyn; Harvard University; University of Wisconsin–Madison
- Doctoral advisor: R. H. Bruck

Academic work
- Discipline: Mathematics
- Institutions: University of Chicago
- Doctoral students: Ahmed Chalabi; Peter Landrock
- Main interests: Finite simple groups

George Isaac Glauberman (born 1941) is a mathematician at the University of Chicago who works on finite simple groups. He proved the ZJ theorem and the Z^{*} theorem.

Born in New York City on March 3, 1941, Glauberman did his undergraduate studies at the Polytechnic Institute of Brooklyn, graduating in 1961, and earned a master's degree from Harvard University in 1962. He obtained his PhD degree from the University of Wisconsin–Madison in 1965, under the supervision of Richard Bruck. He has had 22 PhD students, including Ahmed Chalabi and Peter Landrock. He has co-authored with J. L. Alperin, Simon P. Norton, Zvi Arad, and Justin Lynd.

In 1970 he was an invited speaker at the International Congress of Mathematicians at Nice. In 2012 he became a fellow of the American Mathematical Society.

== Selected publications ==
- Glauberman, George (1964), "On loops of odd order", Journal of Algebra, 1 (4): 374–396, doi:10.1016/0021-8693(64)90017-1, ISSN 0021-8693, MR 0175991
- Glauberman, George (1966), "Central elements in core-free groups", Journal of Algebra, 4 (3): 403–420, doi:10.1016/0021-8693(66)90030-5, ISSN 0021-8693, MR 0202822, Zbl 0145.02802
- Glauberman, George (1968), "A characteristic subgroup of a p-stable group", Canadian Journal of Mathematics, 20: 1101–1135, doi:10.4153/cjm-1968-107-2, ISSN 0008-414X, MR 0230807, S2CID 124178077, archived from the original on 2011-08-07
- Glauberman, George (1968), "Correspondences of characters for relatively prime operator groups.", Canadian Journal of Mathematics, 20: 1465–1488, doi:10.4153/cjm-1968-148-x, ISSN 0008-414X, MR 0232866, S2CID 124632069, archived from the original on 2011-08-07
- Glauberman, George (1968), "On loops of odd order. II", Journal of Algebra, 8 (4): 393–414, doi:10.1016/0021-8693(68)90050-1, ISSN 0021-8693, MR 0222198
- Bender, Helmut; Glauberman, George (1994), Local analysis for the odd order theorem, London Mathematical Society Lecture Note Series, vol. 188, Cambridge University Press, ISBN 978-0-521-45716-3, MR 1311244

== See also ==
- Glauberman normal p-complement theorem
