= Britta Späth =

German mathematician

Britta Späth is a German mathematician, and a professor of algebra and number theory at the University of Wuppertal. She is known for her work in group theory and representation theory, and particularly on the McKay conjecture on the character theory of finite groups.

== Education and career ==
Späth is originally from Coburg, Germany. After undergraduate studies at the University of Bayreuth, she became a doctoral student of Gunter Malle in 2003, and completed her Ph.D. with his supervision at the Technical University of Kaiserslautern in 2007.

Next, she became a postdoctoral researcher at the Oberwolfach Research Institute for Mathematics in Germany, Paris Cité University in France, RWTH Aachen University in Germany, and back to the Technical University of Kaiserslautern. It was during her work at Paris Cité University that she met Marc Cabanes, who became her collaborator both on the McKay conjecture and in life. She obtained her professorship at the University of Wuppertal in 2015.

== Recognition ==
Späth was the 2027 recipient of the Frank Nelson Cole Prize in Algebra for her work on the McKay conjecture.
