= Alperin–Brauer–Gorenstein theorem =

In mathematics, the Alperin–Brauer–Gorenstein theorem characterizes the finite simple groups with quasidihedral or wreathed Sylow 2-subgroups. These are isomorphic either to three-dimensional projective special linear groups or projective special unitary groups over a finite field of odd order, depending on a certain congruence, or to the Mathieu group $M_{11}$. Alperin, Brauer & Gorenstein (1970) proved this in the course of 261 pages. The subdivision by 2-fusion is sketched there, given as an exercise in Gorenstein (1968, Ch. 7), and presented in some detail in Kwon et al. (1980).
