= Robert Guralnick =

American mathematician

Robert M. Guralnick
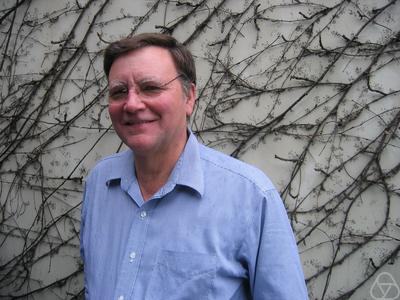
- Guralnick at Oberwolfach, 2007
- Born: 10 July 1950 (age 76); Los Angeles
- Education: UCLA
- Awards: Cole Prize in Algebra (2018)
- Scientific career
- Fields: Mathematics
- Workplaces: University of Southern California
- Doctoral advisor: Basil Gordon

Robert Michael Guralnick (born 10 July 1950) is an American mathematician known for his work in group theory. He works as a Professor of Mathematics at the University of Southern California.

Guralnick was named a Fellow of the American Mathematical Society in 2012, was an invited lecturer at the International Congress of Mathematicians in 2014, and was awarded the Cole Prize in 2018. He is currently managing editor of Forum of Mathematics.
