= Quasidihedral group =

Finite group

Cayley graph of the quasidihedral group of order 16

Cayley graph of the modular maximal-cyclic group of order 16

Cayley graph of the dihedral group of order 16

In mathematics, the quasi-dihedral groups, also called semi-dihedral groups, are certain non-abelian groups of order a power of 2. For every positive integer n greater than or equal to 4, there are exactly four isomorphism classes of non-abelian groups of order 2^{n} which have a cyclic subgroup of index 2. Two are well known, the generalized quaternion group and the dihedral group. One of the remaining two groups is often considered particularly important, since it is an example of a 2-group of maximal nilpotency class. In Bertram Huppert's text Endliche Gruppen, this group is called a "Quasidiedergruppe". In Daniel Gorenstein's text, Finite Groups, this group is called the "semidihedral group". Dummit and Foote refer to it as the "quasidihedral group"; we adopt that name in this article. All give the same presentation for this group:

$$\langle r,s \mid r^{2^{n-1}} = s^2 = 1,\ srs = r^{2^{n-2}-1}\rangle\,\!$$.

The other non-abelian 2-group with cyclic subgroup of index 2 is not given a special name in either text, but referred to as just G or M_{m}(2). When this group has order 16, Dummit and Foote refer to this group as the "modular group of order 16", as its lattice of subgroups is modular. In this article this group will be called the modular maximal-cyclic group of order $2^n$. Its presentation is:

$$\langle r,s \mid r^{2^{n-1}} = s^2 = 1,\ srs = r^{2^{n-2}+1}\rangle\,\!$$.

Both these two groups and the dihedral group are semidirect products of a cyclic group <r> of order 2^{n−1} with a cyclic group <s> of order 2. Such a non-abelian semidirect product is uniquely determined by an element of order 2 in the group of units of the ring $\mathbb{Z}/2^{n-1}\mathbb{Z}$ and there are precisely three such elements, $2^{n-1}-1$, $2^{n-2}-1$, and $2^{n-2}+1$, corresponding to the dihedral group, the quasidihedral, and the modular maximal-cyclic group.

The generalized quaternion group, the dihedral group, and the quasidihedral group of order 2^{n} all have nilpotency class n − 1, and are the only isomorphism classes of groups of order 2^{n} with nilpotency class n − 1. The groups of order p^{n} and nilpotency class n − 1 were the beginning of the classification of all p-groups via coclass. The modular maximal-cyclic group of order 2^{n} always has nilpotency class 2. This makes the modular maximal-cyclic group less interesting, since most groups of order p^{n} for large n have nilpotency class 2 and have proven difficult to understand directly.

The generalized quaternion, the dihedral, and the quasidihedral group are the only 2-groups whose derived subgroup has index 4. The Alperin–Brauer–Gorenstein theorem classifies the simple groups, and to a degree the finite groups, with quasidihedral Sylow 2-subgroups.

== Examples ==
The Sylow 2-subgroups of the following groups are quasidihedral:

- PSL_{3}(F_{q}) for q ≡ 3 mod 4,
- PSU_{3}(F_{q}) for q ≡ 1 mod 4,
- the Mathieu group M_{11},
- GL_{2}(F_{q}) for q ≡ 3 mod 4.
