= Isabel Hubard Escalera =

Mexican mathematician

Isabel Alicia Hubard Escalera
- Occupation: Mathematician
- Known for: Studies of symmetries of combinatorial objects
- Awards: L'Oréal-UNESCO-AMC Fellowship in the area of Exact Sciences, 2012; Kovalevskaia Fund Prize, 2010

Academic background
- Education: York University (Doctoral). School of Sciences, UNAM (Undergraduate).
- Thesis: From geometry to groups and back: the study of highly symmetric polytopes (2007)
- Doctoral advisor: Asia Ivić Weiss
- Website: http://www.matem.unam.mx/fsd/hubard

Isabel Alicia Hubard Escalera is a Mexican mathematician in the Institute of Mathematics of the National Autonomous University of Mexico (UNAM).

== Early life and education ==
As a child, Isabel Alicia Hubard wanted to be a bullfighter. She has said of her family, "My mother is an engineer and my father an accountant. My brother is a mathematician and my sister a physicist. I never thought that I would like math. I simply found it easy and fun, but nothing more. However, my mathematics teacher in junior high and high school, Óscar Chávez, inspired me."

Hubard Escalera began her studies in the Faculty of Sciences of the UNAM, where in 2001, she graduated in Mathematics with a baccalaureate thesis titled Polyhedra colored with cyclic orders. It was written in the Institute of Mathematics of the UNAM, where she carried out investigations related to the combinatorial properties of discrete geometrical objects. Her undergraduate advisor was Javier Bracho Carpizo.

In 2007, she earned a Ph.D. from York University in Canada, with a dissertation titled From geometry to groups and back: the study of highly symmetric polytopes.

== Career ==
Hubard Escalera investigates the study of symmetries of combinatorial objects.

She has been the organiser of the Mexico City Mathematics Olympiad in Mexico City since 2013, an organization that played a prominent role in recent national competitions, achieving the first place of the 2017, 2018 and 2019 Olimpiadas Mexicanas de Matematicas (OMM), and won the basic education national competitions (OMMEB) the same years. She is the delegate for Mexico City in the Mexican Mathematics Olympiad of the Mexican Mathematics Society. She has also been the leader of the Mexican team at EGMO since 2014, competition in which Mexico has won two gold medals, with Isabel mentoring the girls.

== Recognition ==
She was awarded the Kovalevskaia Fund Prize in 2010.

In 2012 she was the first Mexican mathematician to receive the L´Oréal-UNESCO-AMC Fellowship in the area of Exact Sciences for her work, titled Algebra, combinatorics and geometry of abstract two-orbit polytopes. The Fellowship is awarded to "promote the participation of women in science for advanced scientific studies in universities or other recognized Mexican institutions in the areas of exact sciences, natural sciences and engineering and technology."

She was elected to the Mexican Academy of Sciences in 2022.

== Selected publications ==
- Hubard, Isabel; Mixer, Mark; Pellicer, Daniel; Weiss, Asia Ivić (2015). "Cubic tessellations of the helicosms". Discrete & Computational Geometry. 54 (3): 686–704. arXiv:1505.00191. doi:10.1007/s00454-015-9721-y.
- Cunningham, Gabe; Del Río-Francos, María; Hubard, Isabel; Toledo, Micael (2015). "Symmetry type graphs of abstract polytopes and maniplexes". Annals of Combinatorics. 19: 243–268. doi:10.1007/s00026-015-0263-z.
- Conder, Marston; Hubard, Isabel; O’Reilly-Regueiro, Eugenia; Pellicer, Daniel (2015). "Construction of chiral 4-polytopes with alternating or symmetric automorphism group". Journal of Algebraic Combinatorics. 42: 225–244. doi:10.1007/s10801-014-0579-5.
- Bracho, Javier; Hubard, Isabel; Pellicer, Daniel (2014). "A finite chiral 4-Polytope in $\mathbb{R}^4$". Discrete & Computational Geometry. 52: 799–805. doi:10.1007/s00454-014-9631-4.
- Araujo-Pardo, Gabriela; Hubard, Isabel; Oliveros, Déborah; Schulte, Egon (January 2015). "Colorful associahedra and cyclohedra". Journal of Combinatorial Theory. Series A. 129: 122–141. arXiv:1409.5175. doi:10.1016/j.jcta.2014.09.001.
- Mixer, Mark; Hubard, Isabel; Pellicer, Daniel; Weiss, Asia Ivić (2014). "Cubic tessellations of the didicosm". Advances in Geometry. 14 (2): 299–318. doi:10.1515/advgeom-2013-0035.
- Arocha, Jorge L.; Bracho, Javier; García-Colín, Natalia; Hubard, Isabel (August 2015). "Reconstructing surface triangulations by their intersection Matrices". Discussiones Mathematicae Graph Theory. 35 (3): 483–491. arXiv:1402.6012. doi:10.7151/dmgt.1816.
- Arroyo, Aubin; Hubard, Isabel; Kutnar, Klavdija; O’Reilly, Eugenia; Šparl, Primož (2015). "Classification of symmetric Tabačjn graphs". Graphs and Combinatorics. 31 (5): 1137–1153. doi:10.1007/s00373-014-1447-8.
- Hubard, Isabel; Leemans, Dimitri (2014). "Chiral polytopes and Suzuki simple groups". In Connelly, Robert; Weiss, Asia Ivić; Whiteley, Walter (eds.). Rigidity and Symmetry. Fields Institute Communications. Vol. 70. Springer, New York. pp. 155–175. doi:10.1007/978-1-4939-0781-6_9. ISBN 978-1-4939-0780-9.
- Araujo-Pardo, Gabriela; Hubard, Isabel; Oliveros, Déborah; Schulte, Egon (2013). "Colorful polytopes and graphs". Israel Journal of Mathematics. 195 (2): 647–675. arXiv:1203.5175. doi:10.1007/s11856-012-0136-7.
