= Donna Testerman =

Mathematician

Donna Marie Testerman (born 1960) is a mathematician specializing in the representation theory of algebraic groups. She is a professor of mathematics at the École Polytechnique Fédérale de Lausanne in Switzerland.

Testerman completed her Ph.D. at the University of Oregon in 1985. Her dissertation, Certain Embeddings of Simple Algebraic Groups, was supervised by Gary Seitz. As a faculty member at Wesleyan University, she won a Sloan Research Fellowship in 1992.

== Research ==
In 1992, Testerman proved that if G is a semisimple algebraic group over an algebraically closed field k of characteristic p and p is a good prime for G, and u is an element of G satisfying $u^p = 1$, then there exists a subgroup X of G which is isomorphic to the special linear group $SL_2(k)$ or to the projective special linear group $PSL_2(k)$. Testerman also proved a variant theorem where one may take a surjective endomorphism $\sigma$ that fixes u, and conclude that $\sigma(X)\subseteq X$.

In 1993, Martin W. Liebeck, Jan Saxl, and Testerman classified all simple, closed, connected subgroups X of a simple algebraic group G over an algebraically closed field k in the case where $rank(X)\geq\frac{1}{2}rank(G)$ in terms of a subsystem subgroup of G in which X is a subset. In particular, there are only finitely many such conjugacy classes, except in the case where X is D4, G is E7, and the characteristic is 2. Using similar methods, the three authors were also able to use similar methods to classify subgroups X of a finite group of Lie type that is quasisimple where $rank(X)\geq\frac{1}{2}rank(G)$.

== Books ==
Testerman is an author or editor of several books and book-length research monographs in mathematics, including:

- Irreducible subgroups of exceptional algebraic groups (1988)
- $A_1$ subgroups of exceptional algebraic groups (1999)
- Centres of centralizers of unipotent elements in simple algebraic groups (2011)
- Group Representation Theory (2007)
- Linear algebraic groups and finite groups of Lie type (2011)
