= Jordan's theorem =

There are multiple theorems named after the French mathematician Camille Jordan:

- The Jordan curve theorem states that every simple closed curve has a well-defined "inside" and "outside";
- Jordan's lemma is a bound for the error term in applications of the residue theorem;
- Jordan's theorem on group actions characterizes primitive groups containing a large p-cycle; and
- The Jordan–Schur theorem is an effective proof (in terms of the degree) that linear torsion groups are virtually abelian.
