= Sims conjecture =

Conjecture in group theory

In mathematics, the Sims conjecture is a result in group theory, originally proposed by Charles Sims. He conjectured that if $G$ is a primitive permutation group on a finite set $S$ and $G_\alpha$ denotes the stabilizer of the point $\alpha$ in $S$, then there exists an integer-valued function $f$ such that $f(d) \geq |G_\alpha|$ for $d$ the length of any orbit of $G_\alpha$ in the set $S \setminus \{\alpha\}$.

The conjecture was proven by Peter Cameron, Cheryl Praeger, Jan Saxl, and Gary Seitz using the classification of finite simple groups, in particular the fact that only finitely many isomorphism types of sporadic groups exist.

The theorem reads precisely as follows.

Theorem—There exists a function $f: \mathbb{N} \to \mathbb{N}$ such that whenever $G$ is a primitive permutation group and $h > 1$ is the length of a non-trivial orbit of a point stabilizer $H$ in $G$, then the order of $H$ is at most $f(h)$.

Thus, in a primitive permutation group with "large" stabilizers, these stabilizers cannot have any small orbit. A consequence of their proof is that there exist only finitely many connected distance-transitive graphs having degree greater than 2.
