= Liebeck =

Liebeck is a German-language surname. Notable people with the name include:

- Jack Liebeck (born 1980), British violinist
- Martin Liebeck (born 1954), Professor of Pure Mathematics at Imperial College London
- Robert H. Liebeck, American aerospace engineer
- Pamela Liebeck (1930–2020), British mathematician and mathematics educator
- Stella Liebeck, plaintiff in the case of Liebeck v. McDonald's Restaurants, about the temperature of McDonald's coffee
