= Block (permutation group theory) =

In mathematics and group theory, a block for the action of a group $G$ on a set $X$ is a subset $Y$ of $X$ whose images under $G$ either coincide with $Y$ or are disjoint from $Y$. These images form a block system, a partition of $X$ that is $G$-invariant. In terms of the associated equivalence relation on $X$, $G$-invariance means that

$x\sim y$ implies $gx\sim gy$

for all $g\in G$ and all $x,y\in X$. The action of $G$ on $X$ induces a natural action of $G$ on any block system for $X$.

The set of orbits of the $G$-set $X$ is an example of a block system. The corresponding equivalence relation is the smallest $G$-invariant equivalence on $X$ such that the induced action on the block system is trivial.

The partition into singleton sets is a block system and if $X$ is non-empty then the partition into one set $X$ itself is a block system as well (if $X$ is a singleton set then these two partitions are identical). A transitive (and thus non-empty) $G$-set $X$ is said to be primitive if it has no other block systems. For a non-empty $G$-set $X$ the transitivity requirement in the previous definition is only necessary in the case when $|X|=2$ and the group action is trivial.

== Stabilizers of blocks ==
If B is a block, the stabilizer of B is the subgroup

G_{B} = { g ∈ G | gB = B }.

The stabilizer of a block contains the stabilizer G_{x} of each of its elements. Conversely, if x ∈ X and H is a subgroup of G containing G_{x}, then the orbit H.x of x under H is a block contained in the orbit G.x and containing x.

For any x ∈ X, block B containing x and subgroup H ⊆ G containing G_{x} it's G_{B}.x = B ∩ G.x and G_{H.x} = H.

It follows that the blocks containing x and contained in G.x are in one-to-one correspondence with the subgroups of G containing G_{x}. In particular, if the G-set X is transitive then the blocks containing x are in one-to-one correspondence with the subgroups of G containing G_{x}. In this case the G-set X is primitive if and only if either the group action is trivial (then X = {x}) or the stabilizer G_{x} is a maximal subgroup of G (then the stabilizers of all elements of X are the maximal subgroups of G conjugate to G_{x} because G_{gx} = g ⋅ G_{x} ⋅ g^{−1}).

== See also ==
- Congruence relation
