= O'Nan–Scott theorem =

Theorem in group theory

In mathematics, the O'Nan–Scott theorem is one of the most influential theorems of permutation group theory; the classification of finite simple groups is what makes it so useful. Originally the theorem was about maximal subgroups of the symmetric group. It appeared as an appendix to a paper by Leonard Scott written for The Santa Cruz Conference on Finite Groups in 1979, with a footnote that Michael O'Nan had independently proved the same result. Michael Aschbacher and Scott later gave a corrected version of the statement of the theorem.

The theorem states that a maximal subgroup of the symmetric group Sym(Ω), where |Ω| = n, is one of the following:

1. S_{k} × S_{n−k} the stabilizer of a k-set (that is, intransitive)
2. S_{a} wr S_{b} with n = ab, the stabilizer of a partition into b parts of size a (that is, imprimitive)
3. primitive (that is, preserves no nontrivial partition) and of one of the following types:

- AGL(d,p)
- S_{l} wr S_{k}, the stabilizer of the product structure Ω = Δ^{k}
- a group of diagonal type
- an almost simple group

In a survey paper written for the Bulletin of the London Mathematical Society, Peter J. Cameron seems to have been the first to recognize that the real power in the O'Nan–Scott theorem is in the ability to split the finite primitive groups into various types. A complete version of the theorem with a self-contained proof was given by M.W. Liebeck, Cheryl Praeger and Jan Saxl. The theorem is now a standard part of textbooks on permutation groups.

== O'Nan–Scott types ==
The eight O'Nan–Scott types of finite primitive permutation groups are as follows:

HA (holomorph of an abelian group): These are the primitive groups which are subgroups of the affine general linear group AGL(d,p), for some prime p and positive integer d ≥ 1. For such a group G to be primitive, it must contain the subgroup of all translations, and the stabilizer G_{0} in G of the zero vector must be an irreducible subgroup of GL(d,p). Primitive groups of type HA are characterized by having a unique minimal normal subgroup which is elementary abelian and acts regularly.

HS (holomorph of a simple group): Let T be a finite nonabelian simple group. Then M = T×T acts on Ω = T by t^{(t_{1},t_{2})} = t_{1}^{−1}tt_{2}. Now M has two minimal normal subgroups N_{1}, N_{2}, each isomorphic to T and each acts regularly on Ω, one by right multiplication and one by left multiplication. The action of M is primitive and if we take α = 1_{T} we have M_{α} = {(t,t)|t ∈ T}, which includes Inn(T) on Ω. In fact any automorphism of T will act on Ω. A primitive group of type HS is then any group G such that M ≅ T.Inn(T) ≤ G ≤ T.Aut(T). All such groups have N_{1} and N_{2} as minimal normal subgroups.

HC (holomorph of a compound group): Let T be a nonabelian simple group and let N_{1} ≅ N_{2} ≅ T^{k} for some integer k ≥ 2. Let Ω = T^{k}. Then M = N_{1} × N_{2} acts transitively on Ω via x^{(n_{1},n_{2})} = n_{1}^{−1}xn_{2} for all x ∈ Ω, n_{1} ∈ N_{1}, n_{2} ∈ N_{2}. As in the HS case, we have M ≅ T^{k}.Inn(T^{k}) and any automorphism of T^{k} also acts on Ω. A primitive group of type HC is a group G such that M ≤ G ≤ T^{k}.Aut(T^{k})and G induces a subgroup of Aut(T^{k}) = Aut(T)wrS_{k} which acts transitively on the set of k simple direct factors of T^{k}. Any such G has two minimal normal subgroups, each isomorphic to T^{k} and regular.

A group of type HC preserves a product structure Ω = Δ^{k} where Δ = T and G≤ HwrS_{k} where H is a primitive group of type HS on Δ.

TW (twisted wreath): Here G has a unique minimal normal subgroup N and N ≅ T^{k} for some finite nonabelian simple group T and N acts regularly on Ω. Such groups can be constructed as twisted wreath products and hence the label TW. The conditions required to get primitivity imply that k≥ 6 so the smallest degree of such a primitive group is 60^{6} .

AS (almost simple): Here G is a group lying between T and Aut(T ), that is, G is an almost simple group and so the name. We are not told anything about what the action is, other than that it is primitive. Analysis of this type requires knowing about the possible primitive actions of almost simple groups, which is equivalent to knowing the maximal subgroups of almost simple groups.

SD (simple diagonal): Let N = T^{k} for some nonabelian simple group T and integer k ≥ 2 and let H = {(t,...,t)| t ∈ T} ≤ N. Then N acts on the set Ω of right cosets of H in N by right multiplication. We can take {(t_{1},...,t_{k−1}, 1)| t_{i} ∈ T}to be a set of coset representatives for H in N and so we can identify Ω with T^{k−1}. Now (s_{1},...,s_{k}) ∈ N takes the coset with representative (t_{1},...,t_{k−1}, 1) to the coset H(t_{1}s_{1},...,t_{k−1}s_{k−1}, s_{k}) = H(s_{k}^{−1}t_{k}s_{1},...,s_{k}^{−1}t_{k−1}s_{k−1}, 1). The group S_{k} induces automorphisms of N by permuting the entries and fixes the subgroup H and so acts on the set Ω. Also, note that H acts on Ω by inducing Inn(T) and in fact any automorphism σ of T acts on Ω by taking the coset with representative (t_{1},...,t_{k−1}, 1)to the coset with representative (t_{1}^{σ},...,t_{k−1}^{σ}, 1). Thus we get a group W = N.(Out(T) × S_{k}) ≤ Sym(Ω). A primitive group of type SD is a group G ≤ W such that N ◅ G and G induces a primitive subgroup of S_{k} on the k simple direct factors of N.

CD (compound diagonal): Here Ω = Δ^{k} and G ≤ HwrS_{k} where H is a primitive group of type SD on Δ with minimal normal subgroup T^{l}. Moreover, N = T^{kl} is a minimal normal subgroup of G and G induces a transitive subgroup of S_{k}.

PA (product action): Here Ω = Δ^{k} and G ≤ HwrS_{k} where H is a primitive almost simple group on Δ with socle T. Thus G has a product action on Ω. Moreover, N = T^{k} ◅ G and G induces a transitive subgroup of S_{k} in its action on the k simple direct factors of N.

Some authors use different divisions of the types. The most common is to include types HS and SD together as a “diagonal type” and types HC, CD and PA together as a “product action type." Praeger later generalized the O’Nan–Scott Theorem to quasiprimitive groups (groups with faithful actions such that the restriction to every nontrivial normal subgroup is transitive).
