= Cours d'analyse de l'École polytechnique =

Book on mathematical analysis by Camille Jordan published in 1882

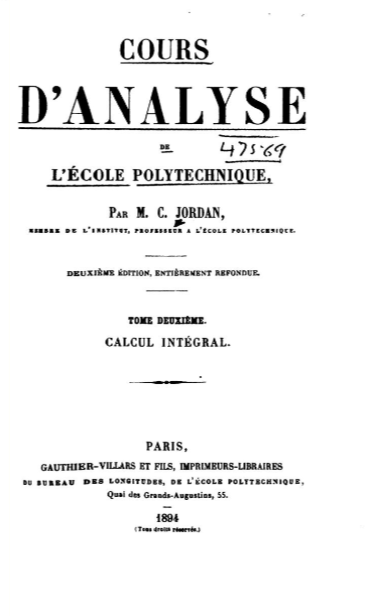
- Title page for Cours d'analyse de l'École polytechnique (1894)
- Author: Camille Jordan
- Subject: Mathematics
- Genre: Non-fiction
- Publication date: 1882

Cours d'analyse de l'École polytechnique is an 1882 book on mathematical analysis by Camille Jordan. The three volumes (tomes) address differential calculus, integral calculus, and differential equations. The book is remembered for introducing Jordan content of sets in a plane.

Tome II was published in 1883, and tome III in 1897. A second edition was started in 1893 and completed in 1896.

== Contents ==
- Tome I: Calcul Différentiel
  - Chapitre I: Dérivées et différentielles
  - Chapitre II: Formation des équations différentielles
  - Chapitre III: Développements en série
  - Chapitre IV: Maxima et minima
  - Chapitre V: Applications géométriques de la série de Taylor
  - Chapitre VI: Théorie des courbes planes algébriques
- Tome II: Calcul intégral; Intégrales définies et indéfinies
  - Chapitre I: Intégrales indéfinies
  - Chapitre II: Intégrales définies
  - Chapitre III: Intégrales multiples
  - Chapitre IV: Des fonctions représentées par des intégrales définies
  - Chapitre V: Développements en série
  - Chapitre VI: Variables imaginaires
  - Chapitre VII: Fonctions elliptiques
- Tome III: Calcul intégral; Équations différentielles
  - Chapitre I: Équations différentielles ordinaires
  - Chapitre II: Équations linéaires
  - Chapitre III: Équations aux dérivées partielles
  - Chapitre IV: Calcul des variations

=== Notable developments ===
Beyond the service as a textbook for students at École polytechnique, Jordan's book advanced mathematical science as follows: Jordan enunciated and proved a topological property of a simple, closed, non-self-intersecting plane curve: the Jordan curve theorem. In the question of which real-valued functions have an integral, researchers sought the appropriate refinement: "Historically it was the introduction of the concept of measurability in the work of Peano and Jordan that was to suggest the manner of insuring the requisite refinement." See Jordan content. In the study of convergence of Fourier series, Jordan extended a criterion first stated by Johann Dirichlet: the Dirichlet–Jordan test.

== Mentions ==
- "In the 1880s and 1890s the most significant and influential theory of the integral was Camille Jordan's."
- "[The Cours] of Jordan occupies amongst [Treatises on Analysis] a pre-eminent place, for aesthetic reasons on one hand, but also because, if it constitutes an admirable setting out of the results of classical analysis, it announces in many ways modern analysis and prepares the way for it."
