= Michael O'Nan =

American mathematician

Michael Ernest O'Nan
- Born: August 9, 1943; Fort Knox, Kentucky, U.S.
- Died: July 31, 2017 (aged 73); Princeton, New Jersey, U.S.
- Education: Princeton University
- Known for: O'Nan group; O'Nan–Scott theorem
- Scientific career
- Fields: Group theory
- Workplaces: Rutgers University
- Doctoral advisor: Daniel Gorenstein

Michael Ernest O'Nan (August 9, 1943, Fort Knox, Kentucky – July 31, 2017, Princeton, New Jersey) was an American mathematician, specializing in group theory.

O'Nan received his PhD in 1970 from Princeton University under Daniel Gorenstein with thesis A Characterization of the Three-Dimensional Projective Unitary Group over a Finite Field. He was a professor at Rutgers University. In 1976 he found strong evidence for the existence of a sporadic group, which Charles Sims constructed. The group is commonly called the O'Nan group after O'Nan.

The O'Nan–Scott theorem in group theory is also named after O'Nan, who discovered it independently from Leonard Scott. It describes the maximal subgroups of the symmetric groups.

== Selected works ==
- Linear Algebra (= Eagle Mathematics Series. vol. 2A). Harcourt Brace Jovanovich, New York NY, 1971, ISBN 0-15-518558-6 (2nd edition.1976, ISBN 0-15-518560-8; 3rd edition. with Herbert Enderton. Harcourt Brace Jovanovich, San Diego CA, 1990, ISBN 0-15-551008-8).
- o'Nan, Michael E. (1975). "Normal structure of the one-point stabilizer of a doubly-transitive permutation group. I" (PDF). Bull. Amer. Math. Soc. 214: 1–42. doi:10.1090/s0002-9947-1975-0393207-3. MR 0393207.
- o'Nan, Michael E. (1975). "Normal structure of the one-point stabilizer of a doubly-transitive permutation group. II" (PDF). Bull. Amer. Math. Soc. 214: 43–74. doi:10.1090/s0002-9947-75-99942-0.
