= O'Nan group =

Sporadic simple group

In group theory, the O'Nan group O'N or O'Nan–Sims group is a sporadic simple group of order

$$460,815,505,920 = 2^9\cdot 3^4\cdot 5\cdot 7^3\cdot 11\cdot 19\cdot 31 \approx 5\times 10^{11}.$$

== History ==
O'N is one of the 26 sporadic groups and was found by Michael O'Nan in a study of groups with a Sylow 2-subgroup of "Alperin type", meaning isomorphic to a Sylow 2-Subgroup of a group of type (Z/2^{n}Z ×Z/2^{n}Z ×Z/2^{n}Z).PSL_{3}(F_{2}). In O'Nan's original paper, the definition of Alperin type required that n ≥ 2, because the n = 1 case had already been classified. If this restriction is removed, then the following simple groups have Sylow 2-subgroups of Alperin type:

- For the Chevalley group G_{2}(q), if q is congruent to 3 or 5 mod 8, n = 1 and the extension does not split.
- For the Steinberg group ^{3}D_{4}(q), if q is congruent to 3 or 5 mod 8, n = 1 and the extension does not split.
- For the alternating group A_{8}, n = 1 and the extension splits.
- For the O'Nan group, n = 2 and the extension does not split.
- For the Higman-Sims group, n = 2 and the extension splits.

The Schur multiplier has order 3, and its outer automorphism group has order 2. Griess showed that O'N cannot be a subquotient of the monster group. Thus it is one of the 6 sporadic groups called the pariahs.

== Representations ==
Ryba showed that its triple cover has two 45-dimensional representations over the field with 7 elements, exchanged by an outer automorphism.

The degrees of irreducible representations of the O'Nan group are 1, 10944, 13376, 13376, 25916, ... (sequence A003919 in the OEIS).

== Maximal subgroups ==
Wilson and Yoshiara independently found the 13 conjugacy classes of maximal subgroups of O'N as follows:

Maximal subgroups of O'N
No.	Structure	Order	Index	Comments
1,2	L_{3}(7):2	3,753,792 = 2^{6}·3^{2}·7^{3}·19	122,760 = 2^{3}·3^{2}·5·11·31	two classes, fused by an outer automorphism
3	J_{1}	175,560 = 2^{3}·3·5·7·11·19	2,624,832 = 2^{6}·3^{3}·7^{2}·31	the subgroup fixed by an outer involution in O'N:2
4	4_{2}^{·}L_{3}(4):2_{1}	161,280 = 2^{9}·3^{2}·5·7	2,857,239 = 3^{2}·7^{2}·11·19·31	the centralizer of an (inner) involution in O'N
5	(3^{2}:4 × A_{6})^{·}2	25,920 = 2^{6}·3^{4}·5	17,778,376 = 2^{3}·7^{3}·11·19·31	
6	3^{4}:2^{1+4}.D_{10}	25,920 = 2^{6}·3^{4}·5	17,778,376 = 2^{3}·7^{3}·11·19·31	
7,8	L_{2}(31)	14,880 = 2^{5}·3·5·31	30,968,784 = 2^{4}·3^{3}·7^{3}·11·19	two classes, fused by an outer automorphism
9	4^{3 ·}L_{3}(2)	10,752 = 2^{9}·3·7	42,858,585 = 3^{3}·5·7^{2}·11·19·31	
10,11	M_{11}	7,920 = 2^{4}·3^{2}·5·11	58,183,776 = 2^{5}·3^{2}·7^{3}·19·31	two classes, fused by an outer automorphism
12,13	A_{7}	2,520 = 2^{3}·3^{2}·5·7	182,863,296 = 2^{6}·3^{2}·7^{2}·11·19·31	two classes, fused by an outer automorphism

== O'Nan moonshine ==
In 2017, John F. R. Duncan, Michael H. Mertens, and Ken Ono proved theorems that establish an analogue of monstrous moonshine for the O'Nan group. Their results "reveal a role for the O'Nan pariah group as a provider of hidden symmetry to quadratic forms and elliptic curves." The O'Nan moonshine results "also represent the intersection of moonshine theory with the Langlands program, which, since its inception in the 1960s, has become a driving force for research in number theory, geometry and mathematical physics."

An informal description of these developments was written by Erica Klarreich (2017) in Quanta Magazine.
