= Cheryl Praeger =

Australian mathematician

Cheryl Praeger AC FAA
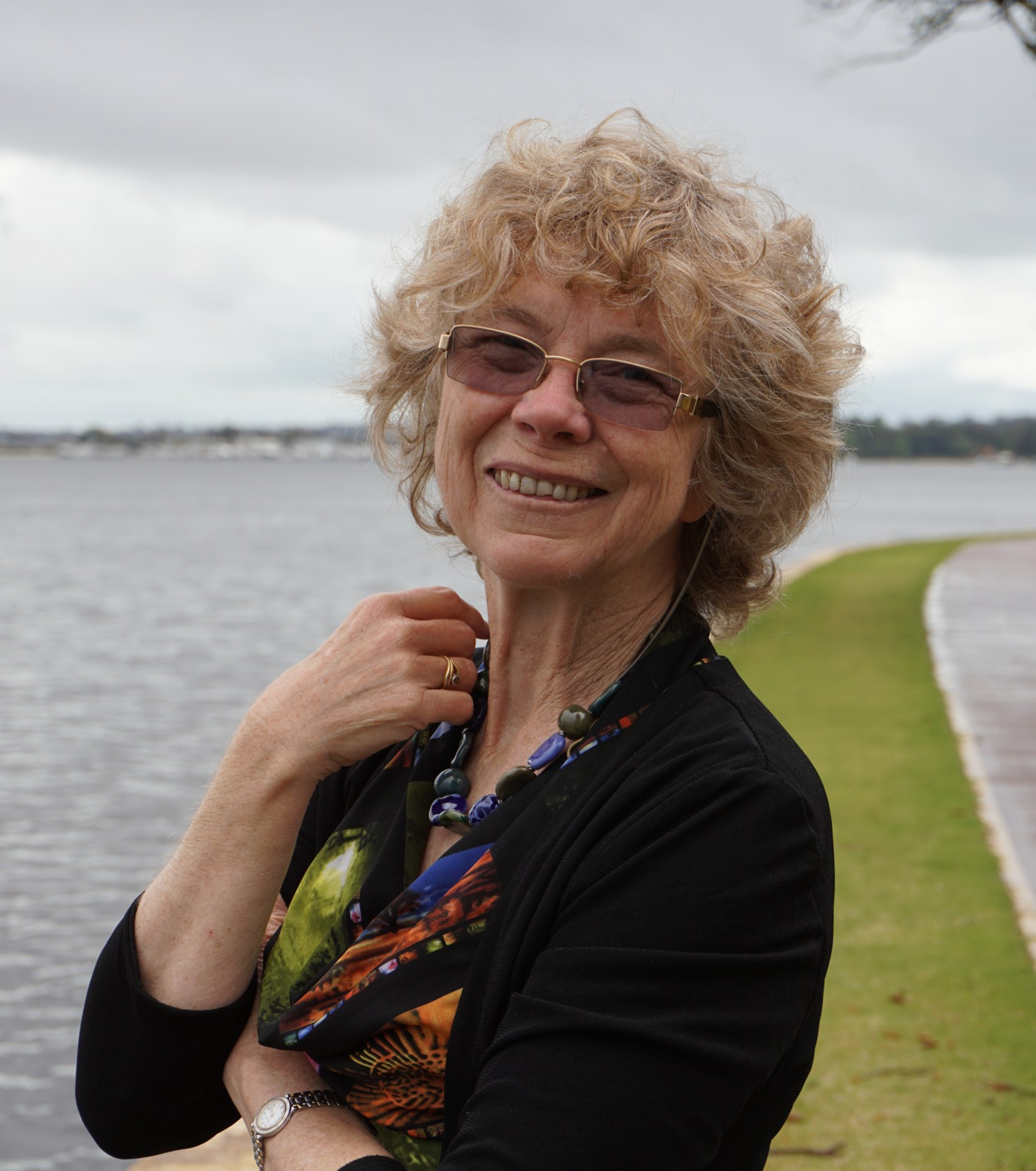
- Praeger by the Swan River in Perth, Western Australia
- Born: Toowoomba, Queensland, Australia
- Education: University of Queensland; University of Oxford; University of Western Australia
- Scientific career
- Fields: Group theory; algebraic graph theory; combinatorial designs
- Workplaces: University of Western Australia
- Doctoral advisor: Peter M. Neumann
- Website: www.maths.uwa.edu.au/~praeger

Cheryl Elisabeth Praeger AC FAA is an Australian mathematician. Praeger received BSc (1969) and MSc degrees from the University of Queensland (1974), and a doctorate from the University of Oxford in 1973 under direction of Peter M. Neumann. She has published widely and has advised 27 PhD students (as of March 2018). As of 2026, she is Emeritus Professor of Mathematics at the University of Western Australia. She is best known for her works in group theory, algebraic graph theory and combinatorial designs.

== Early life and education ==
Cheryl Elisabeth Praeger was born in Toowoomba, Queensland.

She completed her high school education at Brisbane Girls Grammar School. After graduating high school, Praeger went to the government vocational guidance section to inquire about how she could further study mathematics. The vocational guidance officer she spoke with tried to discourage her from studying mathematics further, suggesting she become a teacher or a nurse because two other girls who came to him wanting to study maths were not able to pass their courses. He reluctantly showed her an engineering course description, but she felt it did not have enough mathematics. So she left without getting much information that day, but did continue on to receive her bachelor's and master's degrees from the University of Queensland.

Having met several women on the mathematics staff during her undergraduate studies, the prospect of becoming a mathematician did not seem strange to her. During her first and second years she did honours studies in mathematics and physics, choosing to continue in mathematics after her second year. After completing her education at University of Queensland she was offered a research scholarship at Australian National University (ANU) but chose instead to take the Commonwealth Scholarship to the University of Oxford and attended St Anne's College. At that point she knew she wanted to study algebra. She earned her doctorate in 1973.

== Career ==
Praeger obtained a research fellowship at ANU. She had her first opportunity at teaching regular classes at the University of Virginia during the semester she worked there. Afterwards, she returned to ANU, where she met her future husband, John Henstridge, who was studying statistics.

She was later offered a short-term position at the University of Western Australia, which turned into a long term position. In 1989 she received the degree of Doctor of Science from the University of Western Australia for her work on permutation groups and algebraic graph theory.

Her career has been largely spent in the Department of Mathematics and Statistics at the University of Western Australia. She was appointed full professor in 1983 and was head of the Department of Mathematics 1992–1994, inaugural dean of postgraduate research studies 1996–1998, chair Promotions and Tenure Committee 2000–2004, deputy dean of the Faculty of Engineering Computing and Mathematics 2003–2006, ARC Professorial Fellow 2007. and ARC Federation Fellow in 2009.

Praeger has supervised over 30 graduate students and in 1997 she supervised the Honours research work of Akshay Venkatesh who went on to win a 2018 Fields Medal, commonly regarded as the highest prize in mathematics.

During her career, Praeger has been invited to speak at many conferences, including ones in Croatia, Canada, China, US, UK, South Korea, Singapore, Sweden, Slovakia, Serbia, Hong Kong, Morocco, Slovakia, Slovenia, France, Germany, Greece, USSR, Belgium, Iran, Italy, Pakistan, the Philippines, and Japan.

== Awards, honours, and memberships ==
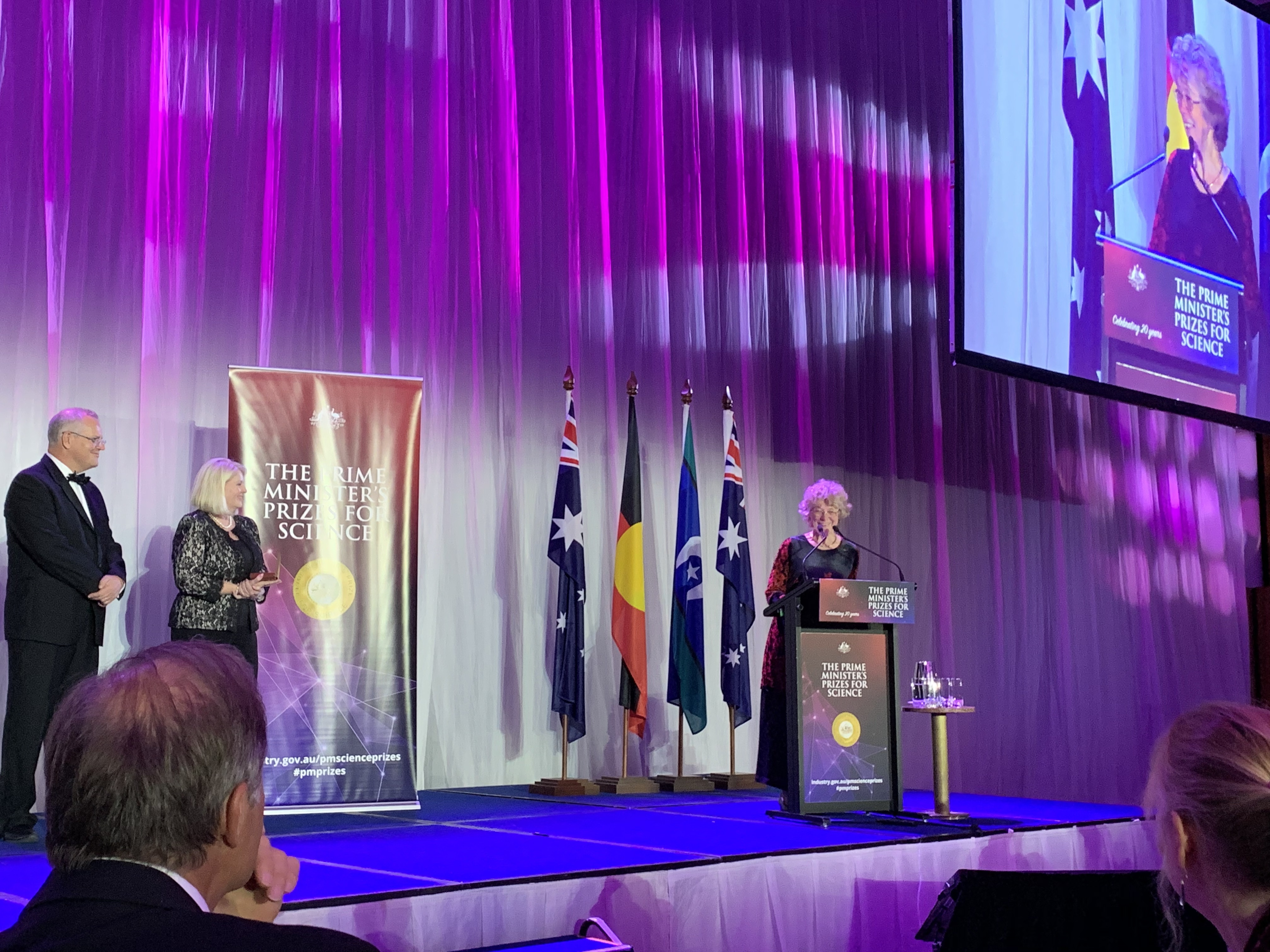
Praeger receiving the Prime Minister's Prize for Science in 2019

Praeger is a Fellow of the Australian Academy of Science, former president of the Australian Mathematical Society (1992–1994 and first female president of the society). She was appointed as a Member of the Order of Australia in 1999 and promoted to Companion in 2021.

Awards and honours include:

- Certificate of Merit of the Royal Humane Society of New South Wales for "actions involving a drowning, rescue at Batemans Bay on the 23rd November 1974" (1976).
- Honorary Doctor of Science from the Prince of Songkla University, Thailand (1993)
- Fellow of the Australian Academy of Science (1996)
- Member of the Order of Australia for her service to mathematics in Australia, especially through research and professional associations (1999).
- Centenary Medal of the Australian Government (2003)
- Doctor Honoris Causis from the Université Libre de Bruxelles, Belgium (2005)
- Western Australian Scientist of the Year (2009)
- Moyal Medal of Macquarie University, Australia (2011; the first female recipient of the Medal since its establishment in 2000)
- 2011 Euler Medal of the Institute of Combinatorics and its Applications (presented in 2017)
- Fellow of the American Mathematical Society (2012)
- Thomas Ranken Lyle Medal of the Australian Academy of Science (2013; the first female recipient of the Medal since its establishment in 1935)
- George Szekeres Medal of the Australian Mathematical Society (2014; the first female recipient of the Medal since its establishment in 2002)
- Honorary Member of the London Mathematical Society (2014)
- Honorary doctorate in Mathematics Education by Yazd University, Iran (2015)
- Mehdi Behzad Prize of the Iranian Mathematical Society, for management in mathematics (2015)
- Honorary Doctor of Science from the University of Saint Andrews, Scotland (2015)
- Inducted into the Western Australian Science Hall of Fame (2015).
- Inducted into the Western Australian Women's Hall of Fame (2015)
- Honorary Doctor of Mathematics from the University of Queensland, Australia (2017)
- Honorary Doctor from the University of Primorska, Slovenia (2018)
- Prime Minister's Prize for Science (2019).
- Kirk Distinguished Visiting Fellow at the Isaac Newton Institute in Cambridge (2020)
- Companion of the Order of Australia for "eminent service to mathematics, and to tertiary education, as a leading academic and researcher, to international organisations, and as a champion of women in STEM careers". This is Australia's highest civic honour. (2021)
- Inaugural Ruby Payne-Scott Medal and Lecture of the Australian Academy of Science (2021).
- Appointed a Fellow of the International Science Council (2023)
- Honorary Fellow of the Institute of Combinatorics and its Applications (2024)

Since 2014, the Women in Mathematics Special Interest Group of the Australian Mathematical Society bestows the Cheryl E. Praeger Travel Awards to female mathematicians. Since 2017 the Australian Mathematics Trust has awarded the Cheryl Praeger Medal to the best performing female contestants in the Australian Mathematics Competition.

Praeger has also held memberships with the Combinatorial Mathematics Society of Australasia, Institute of Combinatorics and its Applications, Australian Mathematics Trust, American Mathematical Society, and the London Mathematical Society. Her past affiliations have not been limited to academia.

== Other activities ==
Praeger has been a member of the Curriculum Development Council of the Commonwealth Schools Commission, the Prime Ministers Science Advisory Council, WISET Advisory Committee to the Federal Minister for Science on participation of women in Science, Engineering, and Technology, UWA Academy of Young Mathematicians Lectures, the Western Australian School Mathematics Enrichment Course Tutor, and Data Analysis Australia Pty Ltd. She has also served on the Australian Federation of University Women (Western Australian Branch) and the Nedlands Primary School Council. Between 1992 and 2019 she was a board member of the Australian Mathematics Trust. From 2001 to 2019 she chaired the Australian Mathematical Olympiad Committee. From 2020 to 2025 she was a member of the National Science and Technology Council that provides advice to the prime minister and the minister for science.

Between 2007 and 2014 Praeger was a member of the executive committee of the International Mathematical Union and between 2013 and 2016 a vice president of the International Commission on Mathematical Instruction.

Between 2014 and 2018 Praeger was foreign secretary of the Australian Academy of Science. She was elected as a Member-at-Large of the executive board of the Association of Academies and Societies of Sciences in Asia (AASSA) for 2016–18 and accepted an invitation to chair the AASSA Committee of Women in Science and Engineering (WISE). She was a Member of the executive committee of the Inter Academy Partnership - Science, 2017–19. Between 2019 and 2022 she was a member of the Committee for Freedom and Responsibility in Science of the International Science Council.

Praeger promotes the involvement of women in mathematics by encouraging girls in primary and secondary schools with lectures, workshops, conferences and through the Family Maths Program Australia (FAMPA), which she was key in implementing in local primary schools. She is a past Patron of the Mathematical Association of Western Australia.

== Personal life ==
In August 1975 Praeger married John Henstridge in Brisbane. They have two children.

In addition to holding a doctorate in mathematics, she also holds an Associate in Music, Australia (AMusA) in piano performance and was a member of the University of Western Australia Collegium Musicum between 1977 and 1985. She has been a member of the Uniting Church in Australia, Nedlands Parish since 1977, functioned as an elder from 1981 to 1987, and as an organist/pianist since 1985. She lists keyboard music among her stronger interests, along with sailing, hiking, and cycling.

== Research ==
Praeger published her first research paper in1970 while she was still an undergraduate. Since then she has become one of the most highly cited authors in pure mathematics, with (as of January 2026) over 490 publications total. She is known as a prolific collaborator, with over 200 co-authors.

Praeger's research is centred around the mathematics of symmetry, including key work in group theory (especially group actions and permutation groups), combinatorics, analysis of algorithms and complexity, discrete mathematics and geometry. Major areas and results include:

- She has co-authored eleven papers with Peter Cameron, including the proof of Sims conjecture in 1983. This was an early application of the classification of finite simple groups.
- With Jan Saxl and Martin Liebeck, she has co-authored papers on many topics including: permutation groups, primitive permutation groups, simple groups, and almost simple groups. Together they co-authored "On the O'Nan Scott Theorem for primitive permutation groups". It pertains to the classification of finite simple groups, namely the classification of finite primitive permutation groups. The paper contains a complete self-contained proof of the theorem.
- Praeger later went on to generalise the O'Nan–Scott Theorem to quasiprimitive groups.
- Praeger introduced normal quotients of graphs which allows the finite simple groups classification to be applied to analyse symmetric graphs and edge-transitive graphs as well as Cayley graphs. It is now a standard tool in algebraic graph theory.
- With Peter M Neumann she developed and analysed the first randomised algorithm to recognise finite special linear groups. This led to the international matrix group recognition project and was extended to all finite classical groups by Praeger and Alice Niemeyer.
- She has co-authored several papers on symmetric graphs and distance-transitive graphs with Tony Gardiner.

== Selected publications ==
- with Martin Liebeck, Jan Saxl: The maximal factorizations of the finite simple groups and their automorphism groups, American Mathematical Society 1990
- with Leonard Soicher: Low rank representations and graphs for sporadic groups, Cambridge University Press 1997
- with Jason Fulman, Peter Neumann: A generating function approach to the enumeration of matrices in classical groups over finite fields, American Mathematical Society 2005
- with Martin Liebeck, Jan Saxl: Regular subgroups of primitive permutation groups, American Mathematical Society 2010
- with Csaba Schneider: Permutation Groups and Cartesian Decompositions, Cambridge University Press 2018
