= Ruth Margaret Williams =

British physicist (born 1945)

Ruth M Williams
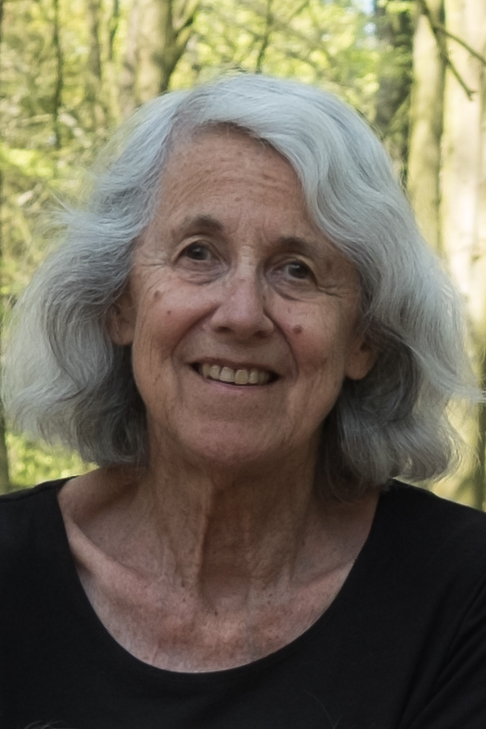
- Born: 1945 (age 80–81); Birmingham, UK
- Education: Girton College, Cambridge (BA); Imperial College, London (PhD)
- Scientific career
- Fields: Mathematics; General Relativity; Discrete Gravity
- Workplaces: Imperial College, London; Center for Theoretical Studies, University of Miami; University of Bristol; University of Cambridge
- Thesis: Current Algebras in Elementary Particle Physics (1968)
- Doctoral advisor: Paul Taunton Matthews
- Website: www.damtp.cam.ac.uk/people/r.m.williams

Ruth Margaret Williams (born 1945) is a British mathematician at the University of Cambridge. Her research focuses on discrete gravity.

== Early life and education ==
Williams was born in Birmingham and attended primary schools in Lozells and Banners Gate. Her secondary education was at Sutton Coldfield High School for Girls. The first member of her family to go to university, she read mathematics at Girton College, Cambridge, then moved to Imperial College, London, for her PhD, which was in theoretical physics and focused on current algebras. She obtained a postdoctoral research position at the Center for Theoretical Studies at the University of Miami (1968-1970). She held a research position at Imperial College (1970-1973) and a temporary lectureship at the University of Bristol (1973-1974), before moving back to a Hertha Ayrton Research Fellowship at Girton College in 1974.

== Career ==
In 1976, Williams became an Official Fellow, Lecturer and Director of Studies in Mathematics at Girton College, positions she held until she retired in 2012. At the Department of Applied Mathematics and Theoretical Physics, University of Cambridge, she was a temporary lecturer (1991-1994), Assistant Director of Research (1994-2002) and Reader in Mathematical Physics from 2002 until retiring in 2012. She is now a Life Fellow at Girton College. Throughout her time in Cambridge, she lectured on and supervised most of the courses in theoretical physics.

== Research ==
Williams’ early research was in elementary particle physics, then during her second postdoctoral position she started working in classical general relativity. Eventually, she combined these two interests by working in quantum gravity in an attempt to find a unified theory of quantum mechanics and general relativity. Her particular approach, called Regge calculus, is a version of discrete gravity where curved space-times are approximated by collections of flat simplices. This may be thought of as a generalisation of geodesic domes to higher dimensions. Williams’ work on Regge calculus includes the classical evolution of model universes, and numerical simulations of discrete quantum gravity, together with investigations of the relationship between Regge calculus and the continuum theory. She has written around 100 papers on her research.

== Knowledge transfer ==
Williams has given talks on her research to student societies, sixth formers and younger pupils. She has been Treasurer of the Cambridgeshire branch of the Royal Institution Mathematics Workshops, which runs Saturday morning sessions to foster the mathematical interest of local twelve- and thirteen-year-olds.

== Publications ==
=== Books ===
- Flat and curved space-times, (1988) Williams, Ruth; Ellis, George; Oxford University Press, (Second Edition 2000).
- Chapter on Bertha Jeffreys in Out of the Shadows: Contributions of Twentieth Century Women to Physics.

=== Non-technical articles ===
Article in New Scientist: Building blocks for space and time.

== Women in STEM ==
Williams has always been especially concerned that women should not be deterred from reaching their potential as mathematicians. To this end, and encouraged by Dusa McDuff, she started the British Women in Mathematics Day, which is now an annual event.

== Personal life ==
Williams is the widow of Czech-born British mathematician, Jan Saxl, Professor of Algebra at the University of Cambridge, and they have one daughter, Miriam.
