= Jordan's inequality =

$\frac{2}{\pi}x\leq \sin(x) \leq x\text{ for }x \in \left[0,\frac{\pi}{2}\right]$

unit circle with angle x and a second circle with radius $|EG|=\sin(x)$ around E. $$\begin{align}&|DE|\leq|\widehat{DC}|\leq|\widehat{DG}|\\ \Leftrightarrow &\sin(x) \leq x \leq\tfrac{\pi}{2}\sin(x)\\ \Rightarrow &\tfrac{2}{\pi}x \leq \sin(x)\leq x  \end{align}$$

In mathematics, Jordan's inequality, named after Camille Jordan, states that

$$\frac{2}{\pi}x\leq \sin(x) \leq x\text{ for }x \in \left[0,\frac{\pi}{2}\right].$$

It can be proven through the geometry of circles (see drawing).
