= Jordan–Schur theorem =

Theorem on finite linear groups

In mathematics, the Jordan–Schur theorem also known as Jordan's theorem on finite linear groups is a theorem in its original form due to Camille Jordan. In that form, it states that there is a function ƒ(n) such that given a finite subgroup G of the group GL(n, C) of invertible n-by-n complex matrices, there is a subgroup H of G with the following properties:

- H is abelian.
- H is a normal subgroup of G.
- The index of H in G satisfies (G : H) ≤ ƒ(n).

Schur proved a more general result that applies when G is not assumed to be finite, but just periodic. Schur showed that ƒ(n) may be taken to be

((8n)^{1/2} + 1)^{2n^{2}} − ((8n)^{1/2} − 1)^{2n^{2}}.

A tighter bound (for n ≥ 3) is due to Speiser, who showed that as long as G is finite, one can take

ƒ(n) = n! 12^{n(π(n+1)+1)}

where π(n) is the prime-counting function. This was subsequently improved by Hans Frederick Blichfeldt who replaced the 12 with a 6. Unpublished work on the finite case was also done by Boris Weisfeiler. Subsequently, Michael Collins, using the classification of finite simple groups, showed that in the finite case, one can take ƒ(n) = (n + 1)! when n is at least 71, and gave near complete descriptions of the behavior for smaller n.

== Generalization to arbitrary fields ==
The theorem has also been extended to finite subgroups of general linear groups over arbitrary fields - with a more complicated albeit analogous statement - by Collins and separately Larsen and Pink. Collins's paper includes exact bounds and depends on the classification of finite simple groups; Larsen and Pink used a different approach that avoids depending on the CFSG.

== See also ==
- Burnside's problem
