= Déborah Oliveros =

Mexican mathematician

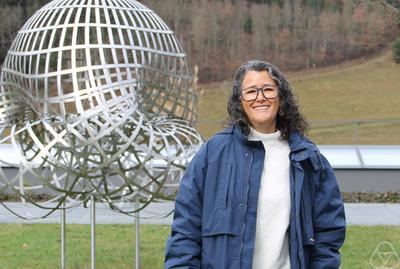
- Oliveros in Oberwolfach, 2024
- Education: UNAM
- Scientific career
- Fields: Discrete geometry, combinatorics, convex geometry
- Thesis: Los volantines : sistemas dinamicos asociados al problema de la flotacion de los cuerpos (1997)
- Doctoral advisor: Luis Montejano, Javier Bracho

Déborah Oliveros Braniff is a Mexican mathematician whose research interests include discrete geometry, combinatorics, and convex geometry, including the geometry of bodies of constant width and related topics.

== Education and career ==
After earning an undergraduate degree in mathematics from the National Autonomous University of Mexico (UNAM) in 1992, and earning a master's degree in 1994 under the mentorship of Mónica Clapp, Oliveros continued at UNAM for graduate study in mathematics, with doctoral research on an unsolved question of Stanislaw Ulam concerning the buoyancy of floating convex bodies. Her 1997 dissertation on the topic, Los volantines : sistemas dinamicos asociados al problema de la flotacion de los cuerpos, was jointly supervised by Luis Montejano and Javier Bracho.

She became a professor at UNAM in 1996, but left in 1999 for postdoctoral research at the University of Calgary in Canada. She became a professor there from 2001 to 2005, when she returned to a professorship at UNAM. She became one of the founders of the branch of the UNAM Institute of Mathematics at the UNAM Juriquilla campus, and directed the institute for 2015–2016. She also holds an affiliation with the Faculty of Engineering of the Autonomous University of Queretaro.

== Book ==
Oliveros is a coauthor with Horst Martini and Luis Montejano of the book Bodies of Constant Width: An Introduction to Convex Geometry with Applications (Birkhäuser, 2019).

== Recognition ==
UNAM gave Oliveros the Sor Juana Inés de la Cruz Recognition in 2014. She is a member of the Mexican Academy of Sciences.
