= Egon Schulte =

American mathematician

Egon Schulte (born January 7, 1955, in Heggen (Kreis Olpe), Germany) is a mathematician and a professor of mathematics at Northeastern University in Boston. He received his Ph.D. in 1980 from the Technical University of Dortmund; his doctoral dissertation was on Regular Incidence Complexes (abstract regular polytopes).

== Selected publications ==
- McMullen, Peter; Schulte, Egon (December 2002), Abstract Regular Polytopes (1st ed.), Cambridge University Press, ISBN 0-521-81496-0
