= Camille Jordan =

French mathematician (1838–1922)

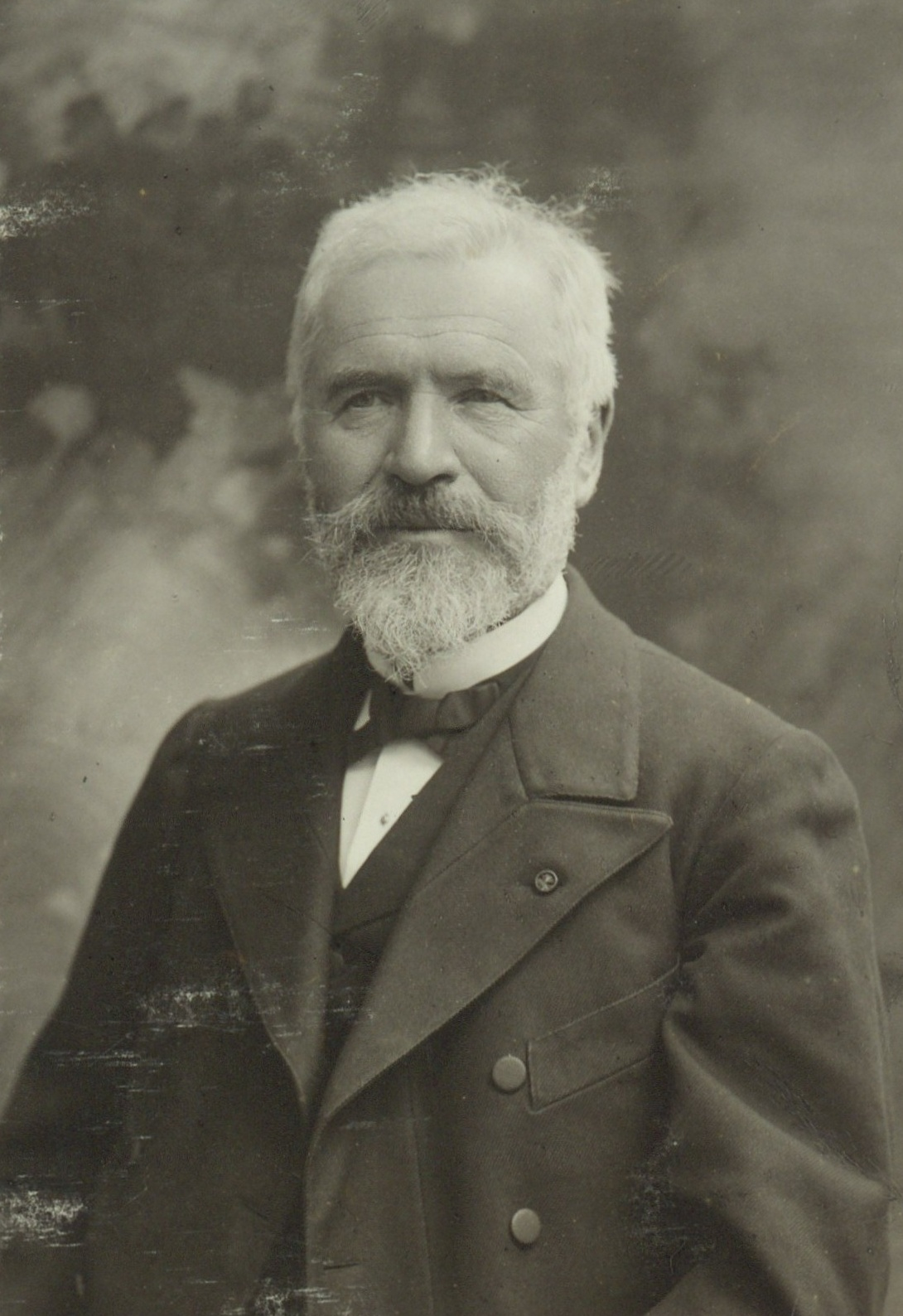
- Born: Marie Ennemond Camille Jordan; 5 January 1838; Lyon, France
- Died: 22 January 1922 (aged 84); Paris, France
- Education: École polytechnique
- Known for: Jordan curve theorem Jordan decomposition Jordan normal form Jordan matrix Jordan measure Jordan totient function Jordan's inequality Jordan's lemma Jordan's theorem (symmetric group); Jordan–Chevalley decomposition Jordan–Hölder theorem Jordan–Pólya numbers Jordan–Schur theorem Jordan–Schönflies theorem Bounded variation Homotopy group k-edge-connected graph Total variation
- Scientific career
- Fields: Mathematics
- Workplaces: École polytechnique
- Theses: Sur le nombre des valeurs des fonctions (1860); Sur les périodes des fonctions inverses des intégrales des différentielles algébriques (1860)
- Academic advisors: Victor Puiseux; Joseph Alfred Serret

Marie Ennemond Camille Jordan (French: [ʒɔʁdɑ̃]; 5 January 1838 – 22 January 1922) was a French mathematician, known both for his foundational work in group theory and for his textbook Cours d'analyse de l'École polytechnique.

== Biography ==
Jordan was born in Lyon and educated at the École polytechnique. He was an engineer by profession; later in life he taught at the École polytechnique and the Collège de France, where he had a reputation for eccentric choices of notation.

He is remembered now by name in a number of results:

- The Jordan curve theorem, a topological result required in complex analysis
- The Jordan normal form and the Jordan matrix in linear algebra
- In mathematical analysis, Jordan measure (or Jordan content) is an area measure that predates measure theory
- In group theory, the Jordan–Hölder theorem on composition series is a basic result.
- Jordan's theorem on finite linear groups

Jordan's work did much to bring Galois theory into the mainstream. He also investigated the Mathieu groups, the first examples of sporadic groups. His Traité des substitutions, on permutation groups, was published in 1870; this treatise won for Jordan the 1870 prix Poncelet. He was an Invited Speaker of the ICM in 1920 in Strasbourg.

The asteroid 25593 Camillejordan and the Institut Camille Jordan are named in his honour.

Camille Jordan is not to be confused with the geodesist Wilhelm Jordan (Gauss–Jordan elimination) or the physicist Pascual Jordan (Jordan algebras).

== Bibliography ==
- Cours d'analyse de l'Ecole Polytechnique; 1 Calcul différentiel (Gauthier-Villars, 1882)
- Cours d'analyse de l'Ecole Polytechnique; 2 Calcul intégral (Gauthier-Villars, 1883)
- Cours d'analyse de l'Ecole Polytechnique; 3 Équations différentielles (Gauthier-Villars, 1887)
- Mémoire sur le nombre des valeurs des fonctions (1861–1869)
- Recherches sur les polyèdres (Gauthier-Villars, 1866)
- Jordan, Camille (1881). "Sur la série de Fourier" [On the Fourier series]. Comptes rendus hebdomadaires des séances de l'Académie des Sciences. 92. Paris: Gauthier-Villars, Académie des Sciences: 228–230.
- Jordan, Camille (1870), Traité des substitutions et des équations algébriques, Paris: Gauthier-Villars
- The collected works of Camille Jordan were published 1961–1964 in four volumes at Gauthier-Villars, Paris.

== See also ==
- Centered tree
- Frenet–Serret formulas
- Pochhammer contour
