= Peano–Jordan measure =

Extended measure of size in mathematics

In mathematics, the Peano–Jordan measure (also known as the Jordan content) is an extension of the notion of size (length, area, volume) to shapes more complicated than, for example, a triangle, disk, or parallelepiped.

For a set to have Jordan measure it should be well-behaved in a certain restrictive sense. For this reason, it is now more common to work with the Lebesgue measure, which is an extension of the Jordan measure to a larger class of sets. Historically, the Jordan measure came first, towards the end of the nineteenth century.

The Peano–Jordan measure is named after its originators, the French mathematician Camille Jordan, and the Italian mathematician Giuseppe Peano.

== Terminology ==
For historical reasons, the term Jordan measure is now well-established for this set function, despite the fact that it is not a true measure in its modern definition, since Jordan-measurable sets do not form a σ-algebra. For example, singleton sets $\{x\}_{x \in \Reals}$in $\Reals$ each have a Jordan measure of 0, while $\Q \cap [0,1]$, a countable union of them, is not Jordan-measurable. For this reason, some authors prefer to use the term Jordan content.

== Jordan measure of "simple sets" ==
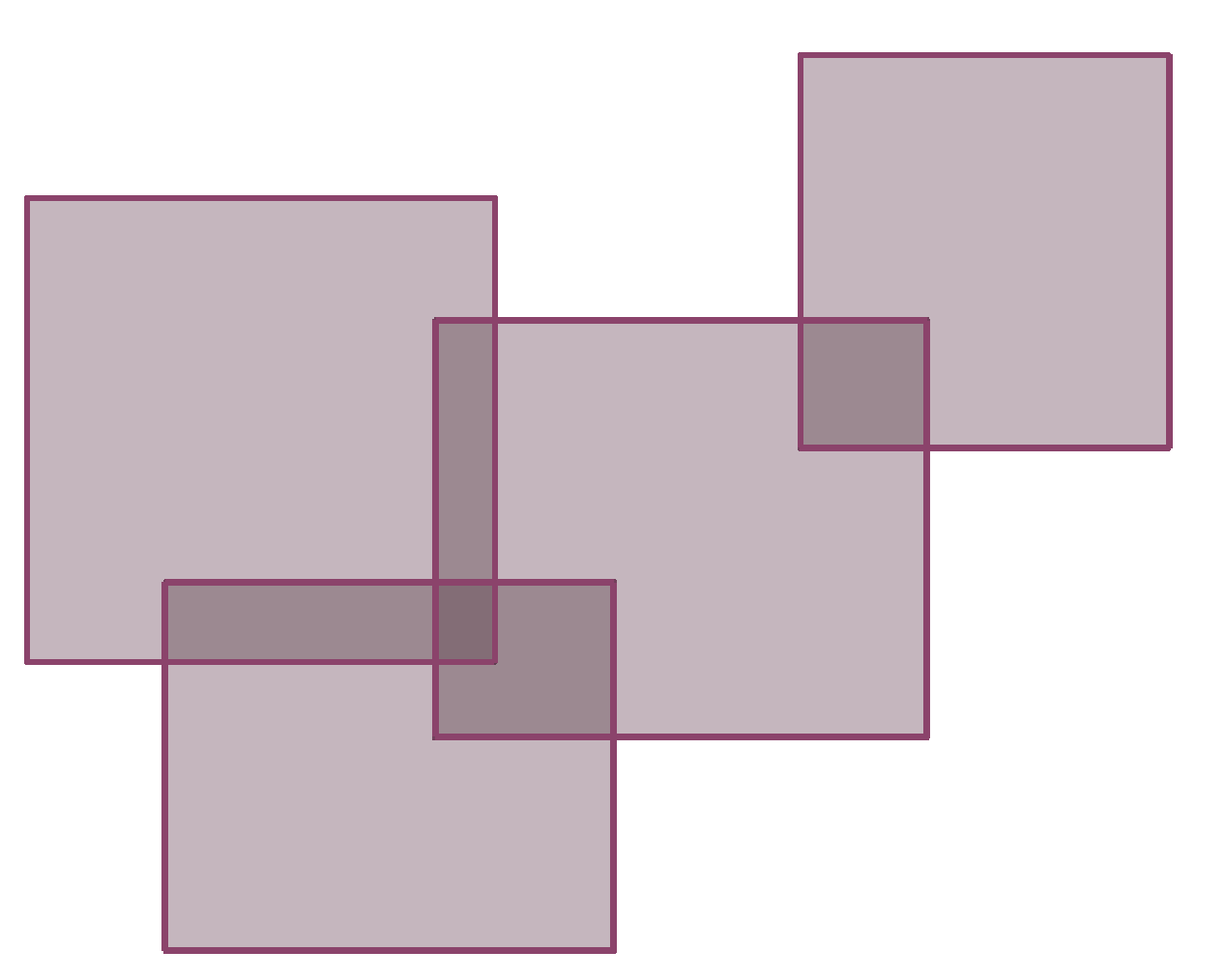
A simple set is, by definition, a union of (possibly overlapping) rectangles.

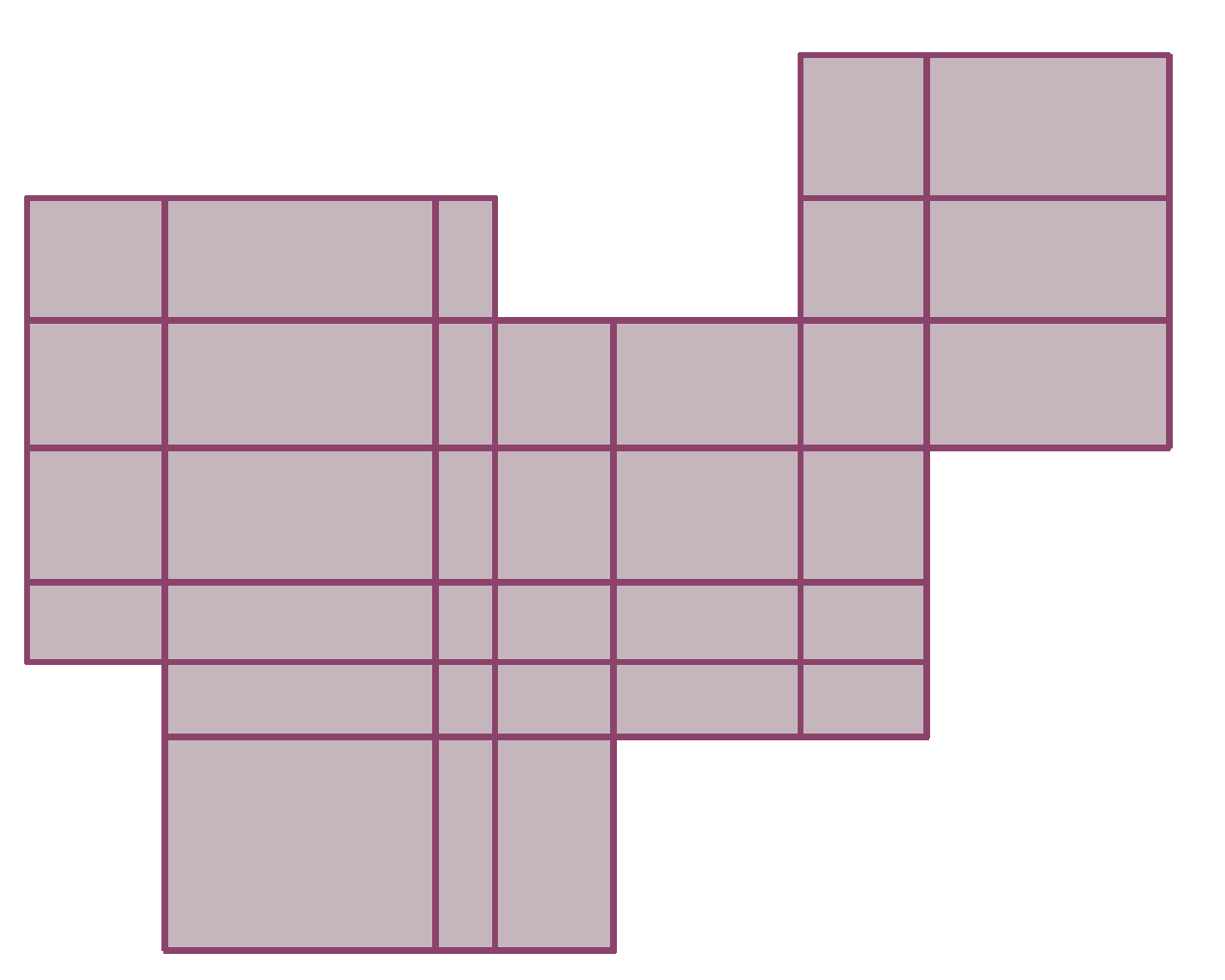
The simple set from above decomposed as a union of non-overlapping rectangles.

Consider Euclidean space $\Reals^n.$ Jordan measure is first defined on Cartesian products of bounded half-open intervals
$$C = [a_1, b_1) \times [a_2, b_2) \times \cdots \times [a_n, b_n)$$
that are closed at the left and open at the right with all endpoints $a_i$ and $b_i$ finite real numbers (half-open intervals is a technical choice; as we see below, one can use closed or open intervals if preferred). Such a set will be called a $n$-dimensional rectangle, or simply a rectangle. The Jordan measure of such a rectangle is defined to be the product of the lengths of the intervals:
$$m(C) = (b_1 - a_1) (b_2 - a_2) \cdots (b_n - a_n).$$

Next, one considers simple sets, sometimes called polyrectangles, which are finite unions of rectangles,
$$S = C_1 \cup C_2 \cup \cdots \cup C_k$$
for any $k \geq 1.$

One cannot define the Jordan measure of $S$ as simply the sum of the measures of the individual rectangles, because such a representation of $S$ is far from unique, and there could be significant overlaps between the rectangles.

Luckily, any such simple set $S$ can be rewritten as a union of another finite family of rectangles, rectangles which this time are mutually disjoint, and then one defines the Jordan measure $m(S)$ as the sum of measures of the disjoint rectangles.

One can show that this definition of the Jordan measure of $S$ is independent of the representation of $S$ as a finite union of disjoint rectangles. It is in the "rewriting" step that the assumption of rectangles being made of half-open intervals is used.

== Extension to more complicated sets ==
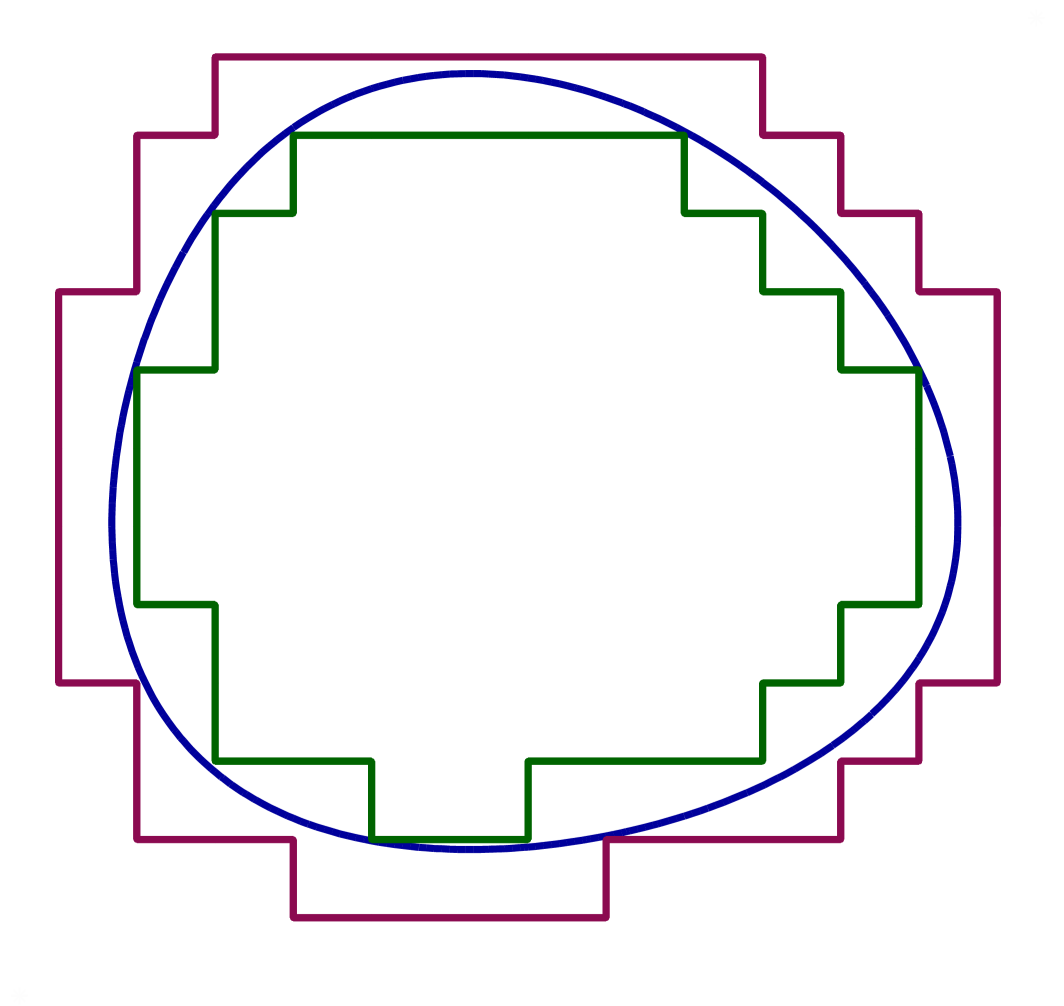
A set (represented in the picture by the region inside the blue curve) is Jordan measurable if and only if it can be well-approximated both from the inside and outside by simple sets (their boundaries are shown in dark green and dark pink respectively).

Notice that a set which is a product of closed intervals,
$$[a_1, b_1] \times [a_2, b_2] \times \cdots \times [a_n, b_n]$$
is not a simple set, and neither is a ball. Thus, so far the set of Jordan measurable sets is still very limited. The key step is then defining a bounded set to be Jordan measurable if it is "well-approximated" by simple sets, exactly in the same way as a function is Riemann integrable if it is well-approximated by piecewise-constant functions.

Formally, for a bounded set $B,$ define its inner Jordan measure as
$$m_*(B) = \sup_{S\subseteq B} m(S)$$
and its outer Jordan measure as
$$m^*(B) = \inf_{S\supseteq B} m(S)$$
where the infimum and supremum are taken over simple sets $S.$ The set $B$ is said to be a Jordan measurable set if the inner measure of $B$ equals the outer measure. The common value of the two measures is then simply called the Jordan measure of $B$. The Jordan measure is the set function that sends Jordan measurable sets to their Jordan measure.

It turns out that all rectangles (open or closed), as well as all balls, simplexes, etc., are Jordan measurable. Also, if one considers two continuous functions, the set of points between the graphs of those functions is Jordan measurable as long as that set is bounded and the common domain of the two functions is Jordan measurable. Any finite union and intersection of Jordan measurable sets is Jordan measurable, as well as the set difference of any two Jordan measurable sets. A compact set is not necessarily Jordan measurable. For example, the ε-Cantor set is not. Its inner Jordan measure vanishes, since its complement is dense; however, its outer Jordan measure does not vanish, since it cannot be less than (in fact, is equal to) its Lebesgue measure. Also, a bounded open set is not necessarily Jordan measurable. For example, the complement of the fat Cantor set (within the interval) is not. A bounded set is Jordan measurable if and only if its indicator function is Riemann-integrable, and the value of the integral is its Jordan measure.

Equivalently, for a bounded set $B$ the inner Jordan measure of $B$ is the Lebesgue measure of the topological interior of $B$ and the outer Jordan measure is the Lebesgue measure of the closure. From this it follows that a bounded set is Jordan measurable if and only if its topological boundary has Lebesgue measure zero. (Or equivalently, if the boundary has Jordan measure zero; the equivalence holds due to compactness of the boundary.)

== The Lebesgue measure ==
This last property greatly limits the types of sets which are Jordan measurable. For example, the set of rational numbers contained in the interval [0,1] is then not Jordan measurable, as its boundary is [0,1] which is not of Jordan measure zero. Intuitively however, the set of rational numbers is a "small" set, as it is countable, and it should have "size" zero. That is indeed true, but only if one replaces the Jordan measure with the Lebesgue measure. The Lebesgue measure of a set is the same as its Jordan measure as long as that set has a Jordan measure. However, the Lebesgue measure is defined for a much wider class of sets, like the set of rational numbers in an interval mentioned earlier, and also for sets which may be unbounded or fractals. Also, the Lebesgue measure, unlike the Jordan measure, is a true measure, that is, any countable union of Lebesgue measurable sets is Lebesgue measurable, whereas countable unions of Jordan measurable sets need not be Jordan measurable.
