= Gabriela Araujo-Pardo =

Mexican mathematician

Martha Gabriela Araujo Pardo
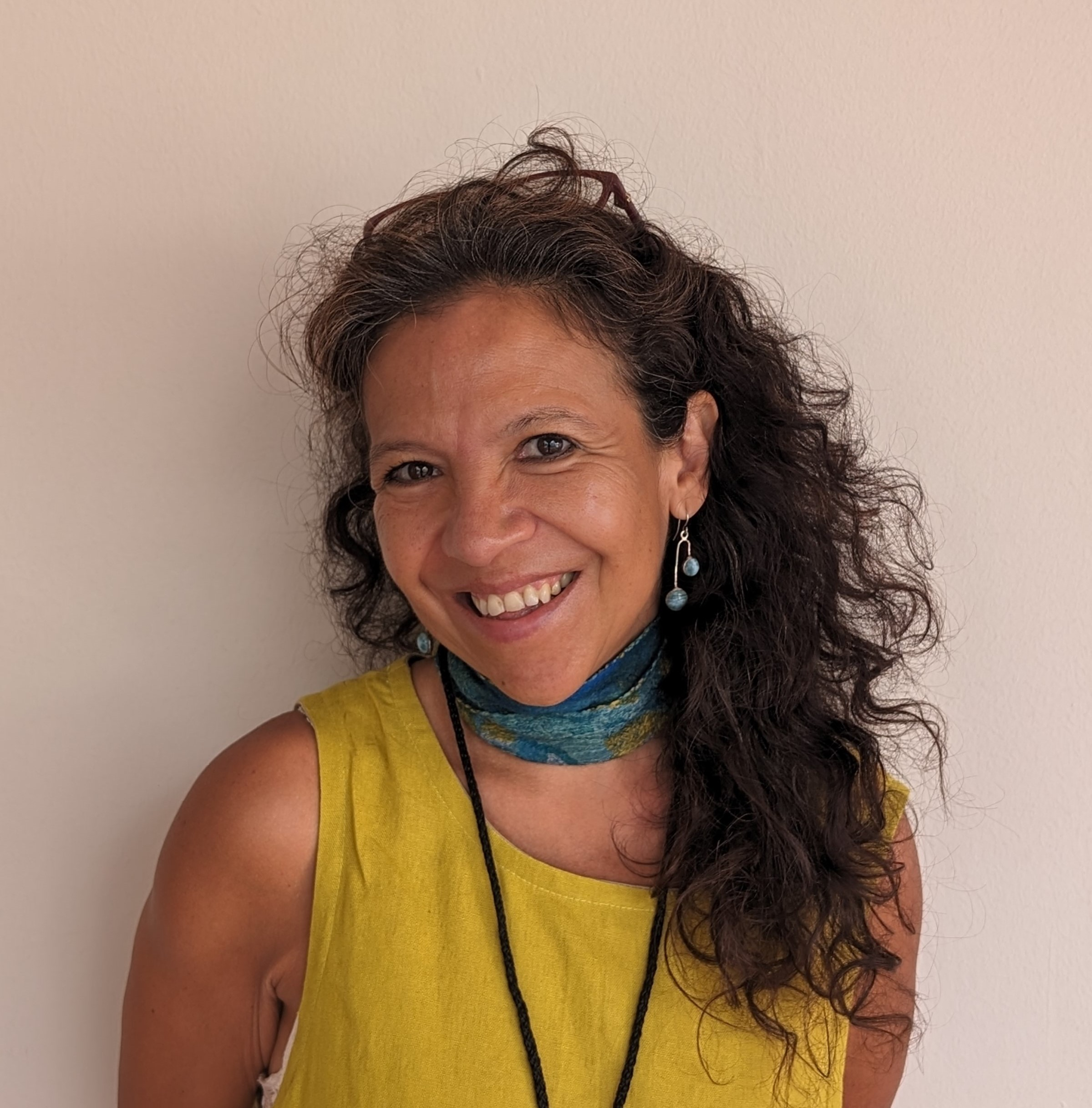
- Araujo at Mérida, México in 2024

Academic background
- Education: UNAM (BS, PhD)
- Thesis: Daisy Structure in Desarguesian Projective Planes
- Doctoral advisor: Luis Montejano Peimbert

Academic work
- Sub-discipline: Discrete Mathematics; Combinatorics; Graph theory; Finite geometry
- Institutions: UNAM

Martha Gabriela Araujo-Pardo is a Mexican mathematician specializing in graph theory, including work on graph coloring, Kneser graphs, cages, and finite geometry. She is a researcher at the National Autonomous University of Mexico in the Mathematics Institute, Juriquilla Campus, and the 2024–2026 president of the Mexican Mathematical Society.

== Education and career ==
Araujo studied mathematics at the National Autonomous University of Mexico (UNAM), where she completed her Ph.D. in 2000. Her dissertation, Daisy Structure in Desarguesian Projective Planes, was supervised by Luis Montejano Peimbert. She has worked for the UNAM Mathematics Institute since 2000, with a postdoctoral research visit to the Polytechnic University of Catalonia in Spain.

She is the president of the Mexican Mathematical Society (SMM) for the term 2024–2026.

== Recognition ==
In 2004, Araujo was awarded the Sofía-Kovalevskaia grant. In 2013, Araujo won UNAM's Sor Juana Inés de la Cruz 2013 award, and was elected to the Mexican Academy of Sciences. In 2024, Araujo was named Fellow of The World Academy of Sciences (TWAS).

== Service ==
In 2012, Araujo served as the spokesperson of the board of Trustees of the Mexican Mathematical Society. In collaboration with other members, they funded the Equity and Gender Commission of the SMM in 2013, "to promote the inclusion of underrepresented groups, in particular women, in the mathematical activity of the country". She was part of the Commission from 2014 to 2018. She was a member of the Directive Commission and the Diversity and Gender Commission of the Union of Mathematical Societies in Latin America and the Caribbean (UMALCA) from 2021 to 2024.

Araujo is the ambassador for Mexico in the Committee of Women of Mathematics of the International Mathematical Union. She was president of the Mexican Mathematical Society (SMM) for the term 2022–2024 and has been reelected for 2024–2026.
