= Eugenia O'Reilly-Regueiro =

Mexican mathematician

Eugenia O'Reilly-Regueiro is a Mexican mathematician specializing in algebraic combinatorics and particular in the symmetries of combinatorial designs, circulant graphs, and abstract polytopes. She is a researcher in the Institute of Mathematics of the National Autonomous University of Mexico (UNAM).

== Education and career ==
O'Reilly-Regueiro is originally from Mexico City. She was a mathematics student at UNAM, graduating in 1995. For the next two years she continued to work at UNAM as an assistant in the mathematics department of the Faculty of Chemistry, while studying harpsichord at UNAM's National School of Music, working there with musician Luisa Durón.

Next, with a scholarship from the UNAM Dirección General de Asuntos del Personal Académico (DGAPA), she traveled to England for graduate study at Imperial College London, at that time part of the University of London system. She completed her PhD in 2003. Her dissertation, Flag-Transitive Symmetric Designs, was supervised by Martin Liebeck.

On completing her doctorate, she returned to UNAM as a researcher for the Institute of Mathematics.

== Recognition ==
O'Reilly-Regueiro was elected to the Mexican Academy of Sciences in 2022.
