= Pamela Liebeck =

British mathematician and mathematics educator

Pamela Liebeck (née Lawrence, 1930–2012) was a British mathematician and mathematics educator, the author of two books on mathematics.

== Life ==
Liebeck was born in Bromley on 11 July 1930, grew up in Surrey, and read mathematics at Somerville College, Oxford beginning in 1949. At Oxford, she also played on the cricket and tennis teams. After additional study at the University of Cambridge, she became a mathematics teacher. Her husband Hans Liebeck was also an Oxford mathematics student; they met through a shared love of playing chamber music, married in 1953, and moved together to Cape Town University in South Africa in 1955, where Liebeck taught mathematics part-time while raising two children and studying music.

In 1961, Liebeck and her husband returned to England. As their (now three) children grew old enough, she returned to teaching, first at the Madeley College of Education in Newcastle-under-Lyme (eventually part of Staffordshire University) and then at Keele University, where her husband had been posted since their return to England.

Her son, Martin W. Liebeck, became a mathematics professor at Imperial College London.

She died on 3 July 2012.

== Books ==
Liebeck wrote two books on mathematics:

- Vectors and Matrices (Pergamon, 1971)
- How Children Learn Mathematics: A Guide for Parents and Teachers (Penguin, 1984)
