= Jan Saxl =

Czech-British mathematician (1948–2020)

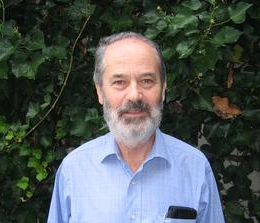
- Jan Saxl at Oberwolfach in 2007
- Born: 5 June 1948; Brno, Czechoslovakia
- Died: 2 May 2020 (aged 71)
- Education: University of Oxford
- Scientific career
- Fields: Mathematics
- Workplaces: University of Cambridge; University of Glasgow
- Thesis: Multiply Transitive Permutation Groups (1973)
- Doctoral advisor: Peter M. Neumann

Jan Saxl (5 June 1948 – 2 May 2020) was a Czech-British mathematician, and a professor at the University of Cambridge. He was known for his work in finite group theory, particularly on consequences of the classification of finite simple groups.

== Education and career ==
Saxl was born in Brno, in what was at the time Czechoslovakia. He came to the United Kingdom in 1968, during the Prague Spring. After undergraduate studies at the University of Bristol, he completed his DPhil in 1973 at the University of Oxford under the direction of Peter M. Neumann, with the title of Multiply Transitive Permutation Groups.

Saxl held postdoctoral positions at Oxford and the University of Illinois at Chicago, and a lecturer position at the University of Glasgow. He moved to the University of Cambridge in 1976, and spent the rest of his career there. He was elected as a fellow of Gonville and Caius College in 1986, and he retired in 2015.

Saxl published around 100 papers, and according to MathSciNet, these have been cited over 1900 times. He is noted for his work in finite group theory, particularly on permutation groups, and often coauthored with Robert Guralnick, Martin Liebeck, and Cheryl Praeger. Some notable and highly-cited examples of this work are as follows. Liebeck, Saxl and Praeger gave a relatively simple and self-contained proof of the O'Nan–Scott theorem. It had long been known that every maximal subgroup of a symmetric group or alternating group was intransitive, imprimitive, or primitive, and the same authors in 1988 gave a partial description of which primitive subgroups could occur.

== Personal life ==
Saxl was married to Cambridge mathematician Ruth M. Williams and they had one daughter, Miriam.

== Death ==
Saxl died on 2 May 2020, after a long period of poor health.

== Awards and honors ==
A three-day conference in the joint honor of Saxl and Martin Liebeck was held at the University of Cambridge in July 2015.

== Publications ==
Books

- Liebeck, Martin; Praeger, Cheryl; Saxl, Jan (2010). "Regular subgroups of primitive permutation groups". Memoirs of the American Mathematical Society. 203 (952). American Mathematical Society (AMS). doi:10.1090/s0065-9266-09-00569-9. ISBN 978-0-8218-4654-4. ISSN 0065-9266. MR 2588738. OCLC 457767029.
- Guralnick, Robert M.; Müller, Peter; Saxl, Jan (2003). "The rational function analogue of a question of Schur and exceptionality of permutation representations". Memoirs of the American Mathematical Society. 162 (773). American Mathematical Society (AMS). arXiv:math/0201069. doi:10.1090/memo/0773. ISBN 9780821832882. ISSN 0065-9266. MR 1955160. S2CID 7113361.
- Ivanov, Alexander A.; Liebeck, Martin W.; Saxl, Jan, eds. (2003). Groups combinatorics & geometry : Durham 2001. New Jersey London: World Scientific. ISBN 981-238-312-3. OCLC 228115554.
- Liebeck, Martin W.; Saxl, Jan, eds. (1992). Groups, combinatorics & geometry : Durham, 1990. Cambridge England New York: Cambridge University Press. ISBN 978-0-521-40685-7. OCLC 839544039.
- Liebeck, Martin W.; Praeger, Cheryl E.; Saxl, Jan (1990). "The maximal factorizations of the finite simple groups and their automorphism groups". Memoirs of the American Mathematical Society. 86 (432). American Mathematical Society (AMS). doi:10.1090/memo/0432. ISBN 9780821861554. ISSN 0065-9266. MR 1016353.

Selected articles

- Liebeck, Martin W.; Praeger, Cheryl E.; Saxl, Jan (1988). "On the O'Nan-Scott theorem for finite primitive permutation groups". Journal of the Australian Mathematical Society, Series A. 44 (3). Cambridge University Press (CUP): 389–396. doi:10.1017/s144678870003216x. ISSN 0263-6115.
