= Jordan's theorem (symmetric group) =

In finite group theory, Jordan's theorem states that if a primitive permutation group G is a subgroup of the symmetric group S_{n} and contains a p-cycle for some prime number p < n − 2, then G is either the whole symmetric group S_{n} or the alternating group A_{n}. It was first proved by Camille Jordan.

A p-cycle moves exactly p points and fixes the remaining n − p points. Thus the condition p < n − 2 is equivalent to requiring that the cycle have at least three fixed points.

The statement can be generalized to the case that p is a prime power.

Prime-power extensions of Jordan's theorem were studied by Peter M. Neumann and others. Neumann's 1975 paper considered primitive permutation groups containing a cycle of prime-power length.
