= Gary Seitz =

American mathematician (1943–2023)

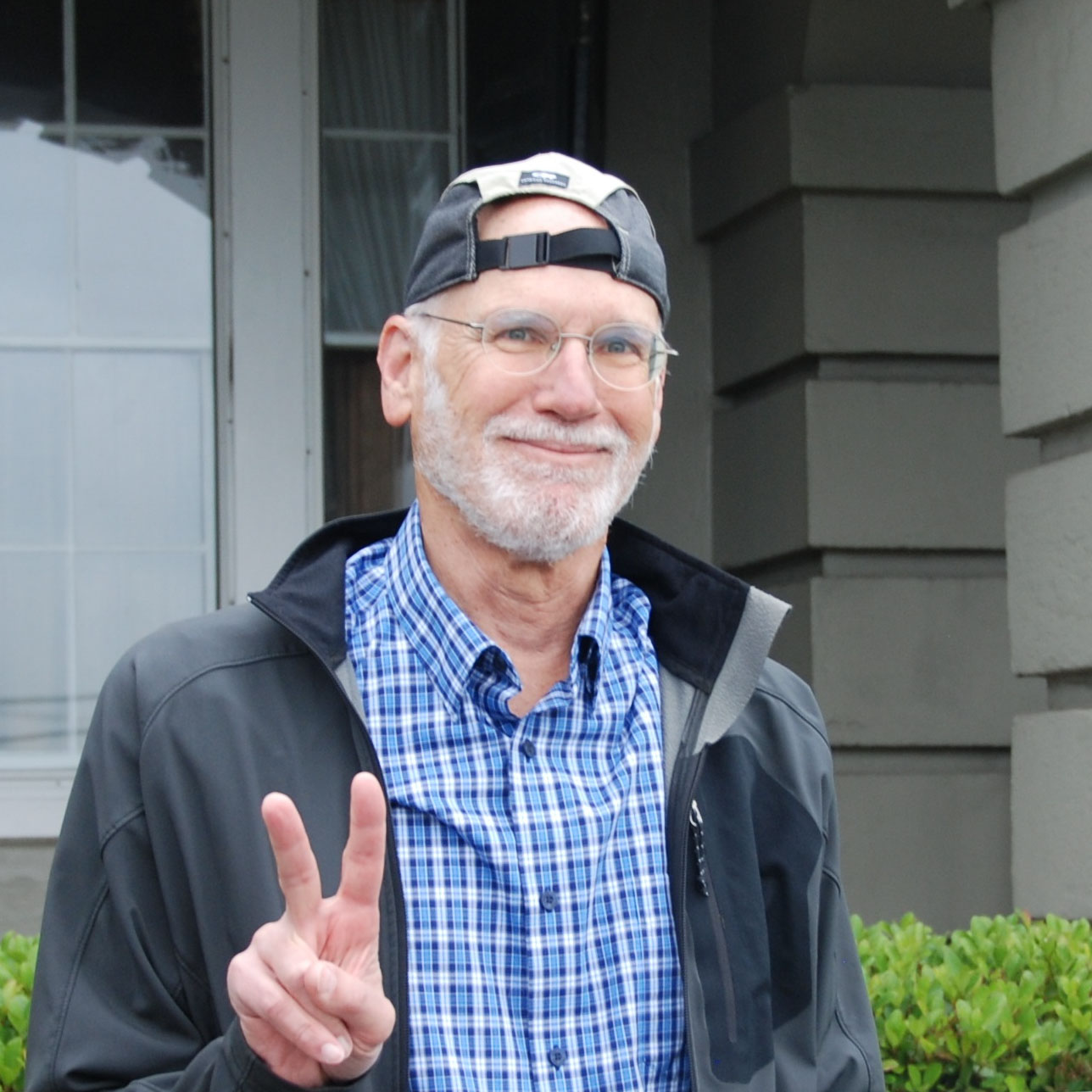
- Born: May 10, 1943; Santa Monica, California
- Died: October 30, 2023 (aged 80)
- Education: University of Oregon; University of California, Berkeley
- Known for: Group Theory
- Scientific career
- Fields: Mathematics
- Workplaces: University of Oregon
- Doctoral advisor: Charles W. Curtis

Gary Michael Seitz (May 10, 1943 – October 30, 2023) was an American mathematician, a Fellow of the American Mathematical Society and a College of Arts and Sciences Distinguished Professor Emeritus in Mathematics at the University of Oregon. He received his Ph.D. from the University of Oregon in 1968, where his adviser was Charles W. Curtis. Seitz specialized in the study of algebraic and finite groups. Seitz was active in the effort to exploit the relationship between algebraic groups and the finite groups of Lie type, in order to study the structure and representations of groups in the latter class. Such information is important in its own right, but was also critical in the classification of the finite simple groups, a major achievement of 20th century mathematics. Seitz made contributions to the classification of finite simple groups, such as those containing standard subgroups of Lie type. Following the classification, he pioneered the study of the subgroup structure of simple algebraic groups, and as an application went a long way towards solving the maximal subgroup problem for finite groups. For this work he received the Creativity Award from the National Science Foundation in 1991.

== Education and career ==
Seitz was born in 1943 in Santa Monica, California. Seitz received his B.A. and Masters at University of California, Berkeley. He went on to earn his Ph.D. at the University of Oregon in 1968. He joined the faculty of the University of Illinois at Chicago in 1968. In 1970, he moved to University of Oregon as assistant professor, where he became a full professor in 1977 and a CAS Distinguished Professor in 2000. In his tenure at University of Oregon he also served as the Department Head of Mathematics and Associate Dean for the sciences in the College of Arts and Sciences. He served as thesis advisor for eleven PhD students. He was a visiting professor at the Institute for Advanced Study, California Institute of Technology, Cambridge University, Institut des Hautes Etudes Scientifiques, Imperial College, Tel Aviv University, Utrecht University, Tokyo University, among other institutions.

== Awards and honors ==
In 2004, a conference Groups and Representations was held in honor of Seitz's 60th birthday. In 2025, a special issue of the Pacific Journal of Mathematics was devoted to the memory of Seitz.

== Personal life ==
Seitz died on October 30, 2023.

== Books ==
- The maximal subgroups of the classical algebraic groups, AMS Memoirs, 365, (1987), 1–286.
- Maximal subgroups of exceptional algebraic groups, AMS Memoirs, 441, (1991), 1–197.
- Finite and locally finite groups, NATO ASI Series, (with, B. Hartley, A. Borovik, R. Bryant), Kluwer publishing company, Vol. 471, 1995.
- Reductive Subgroups of exceptional algebraic groups, AMS Memoirs, 580, (1996), 1–111. (with Martin Liebeck).
- Selected papers of E. B. Dynkin with commentary, American Mathematical Society, International Press (with, Onischik, Yushkevich), 2000
- The maximal subgroups of positive dimension in exceptional algebraic groups, AMS Memoirs, 802, (2004), 1–227. (with Martin Liebeck).
- Unipotent and Nilpotent Classes in Simple Algebraic Groups and Lie Algebras, AMS Math. Surveys and Monographs, 180, (2012), 1–380. (with Martin Liebeck).
