= Martin Liebeck =

Martin Walter Liebeck
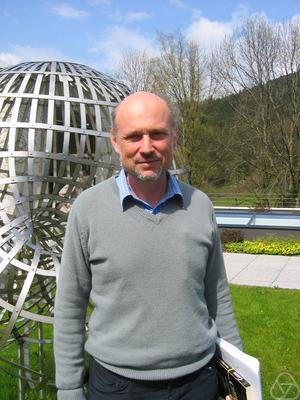
- Liebeck at Oberwolfach in 2008
- Education: University of Oxford
- Scientific career
- Fields: Group theory Algebra; Representation theory
- Workplaces: Imperial College London
- Thesis: Finite Permutation Groups (1979)
- Doctoral advisor: Peter Michael Neumann
- Doctoral students: Eugenia O'Reilly-Regueiro

Martin Liebeck (born 23 September 1954) is a professor of Pure Mathematics at Imperial College London whose research interests include group theory and algebraic combinatorics.

== Career and research ==
Martin Liebeck studied mathematics at the University of Oxford earning a First Class BA in 1976, an MSc in 1977, and a D.Phil. in 1979, with the Dissertation Finite Permutation Groups under Peter M. Neumann.

In January 1991 he was appointed Professor at Imperial College London and became Head of the Pure Mathematics section there in 1997. Liebeck has published over 150 research articles and 10 books. His research interests include algebraic combinatorics, algebraic groups, permutation groups, and finite simple groups.

He was elected Fellow of the American Mathematical Society (AMS) in 2019, and was awarded the London Mathematical Society’s Pólya Prize in 2020.

In February of 2020 he and Colva Roney-Dougal organized a programme titled "Groups, Representations and Applications" at the Isaac Newton Institute for Mathematical Sciences.

== Personal life ==
Martin is the son of mathematician Hans Liebeck and mathematics educationalist Pamela Liebeck. His wife Ann is a professional musician, and they have two sons Jonathan and Matthew. Martin's main hobbies are playing tennis, especially doubles, and the violin, particularly chamber music.

== Selected publications ==
=== Papers ===
- 1990: "The maximal factorizations of the finite simple groups and their automorphism groups", Memoirs Amer. Math. Soc. 86, pp. 1–151 (with C.E. Praeger and Jan Saxl)
- 1995: "The probability of generating a finite simple group", Geom. Dedicata 56, 103-113 (with A. Shalev)
- 1998: "On the subgroup structure of classical groups", Invent. Math. 134, 427-453 (with G.M. Seitz)
- 1999: "Simple groups, permutation groups, and probability", J. Amer. Math. Soc. 12, 497-520 (with A. Shalev)
- 2001: "Diameters of finite simple groups: sharp bounds and applications", Annals of Math. 154, 383-406 (with A. Shalev)
- 2004: "The maximal subgroups of positive dimension in exceptional algebraic groups", Memoirs Amer. Math. Soc. 169, no. 802, pp. 1–227 (with G.M. Seitz)
- 2010: "The Ore Conjecture", J. European Math. Soc., 12, 939–1008 (with E. O’Brien, A. Shalev, P. Tiep)
- 2018: "Character bounds for finite groups of Lie type", Acta Math. 221, 1–57 (with R. Bezrukavnikov, A. Shalev and P. Tiep)
- 2019: "Algorithms determining finite simple images of finitely presented groups", Inventiones Math. 218, 623–648 (with M. Bridson, D.M. Evans and D. Segal)

=== Books ===
- 1990: The Subgroup Structure of the Finite Classical Groups, London Math. Soc. Lecture Note Series No. 129, Cambridge Univ. Press, 303pp. (with P. Kleidman)
- 2000: A Concise Introduction to Pure Mathematics, CRC Press, 2000; Second Edition, 2005; Third Edition, 2010; Fourth Edition, 2015
- 2012: Unipotent and Nilpotent Classes in Simple Algebraic Groups and Lie Algebras, Math. Surveys and Monographs Series, Vol. 180, American Math. Soc., 380pp. (with G.M. Seitz)

== Awards and distinctions ==
- Johnson University Prize, Oxford University, 1979
- Senior Mathematical Prize, Oxford University, 1979
- ISI Highly Cited Researcher, 2011
- Simons Research Professor, MSRI 2018
- The President's Award for Excellence in Leadership, 2019
- Fellow of the American Mathematical Society, 2019
- London Mathematical Society (LMS) Pólya Prize in 2020

== See also ==
- O'Nan–Scott theorem
- Rank 3 permutation group
