= Hanner =

Hanner may refer to:

== People ==
- Barry Hanner (1936–2025), American-German opera singer (baritone)
- Bob Hanner (1945–2019), American businessman and politician
- Bradley Hanner (born 1999), American baseball player
- Dave Hanner (1930–2008), American football player, coach and scout
- Flint Hanner (1898–1973), American mulit-sport track and field athlete and coach
- Olof Hanner (1922–2015), Swedish mathematician

== Other uses ==
- 4664 Hanner, a main-belt asteroid
- Hanner Fieldhouse, a multi-purpose arena in Statesboro, Georgia, United States

== See also ==
- Corbin/Hanner, American country music group
