= Hans Rådström =

Swedish mathematician

- Born: 1919
- Died: 1970 (aged 50–51)
- Citizenship: Sweden
- Education: Stockholm University
- Known for: Rådström's embedding theorem; Rådström characterization of convex sets as generators of continuous semigroups of subsets
- Scientific career
- Fields: Functional equations, set-valued analysis
- Workplaces: Institute for Advanced Study, Princeton University; Stockholm University; Linköping University
- Doctoral advisor: Torsten Carleman, Fritz Carlson
- Doctoral students: Per Enflo

Hans Vilhem Rådström (1919–1970) was a Swedish mathematician who worked on complex analysis, continuous groups, convex sets, set-valued analysis, and game theory. From 1952, he was lektor (assistant professor) at Stockholm University, and from 1969, he was Professor of Applied Mathematics at Linköping University.

== Early life ==
Hans Rådström was the son of the writer and editor Karl Johan Rådström, and the elder brother of the writer and journalist Pär Rådström.

Rådström studied mathematics and obtained his Ph.D. under the joint supervision of Torsten Carleman and Fritz Carlson. His early work pertained to the theory of functions of a complex variable, particularly, complex dynamics. He was appointed lektor (assistant professor) at Stockholm University in 1952. Later, he was associated with the Royal Institute of Technology in Stockholm.

In 1952 he became co-editor of the Scandinavian popular-mathematics journal Nordisk Matematisk Tidskrift. He also edited the Swedish edition of The Scientific American Book of Mathematical Puzzles and Diversions, a recreational mathematics book by Martin Gardner.

== Set-valued analysis ==
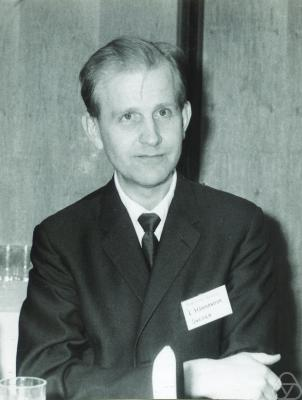
Lars Hörmander (pictured) proved a variant of Rådström's embedding theorem using support functions.

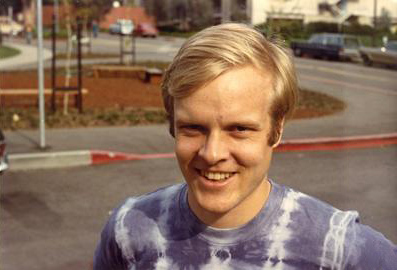
Per Enflo (pictured) wrote his doctoral thesis under the supervision of Hans Rådström.

Rådström was interested in Hilbert's fifth problem on the analyticity of the continuous operation of topological groups. The solution of this problem by Andrew Gleason used constructions of subsets of topological vector spaces, (rather than simply points), and inspired Rådström's research on set-valued analysis.

He visited the Institute for Advanced Study (IAS) in Princeton from 1948 to 1950, where he co-organized a seminar on convexity. Together with Olof Hanner, who, like Rådström, would earn his Ph.D. from Stockholm University in 1952, he improved Werner Fenchel's version of Carathéodory's lemma.

In the 1950s, he obtained important results on convex sets. He proved the Rådström embedding theorem, which implies that the collection of all nonempty compact convex subsets of a normed real vector-space (endowed with the Hausdorff distance) can be isometrically embedded as a convex cone in a normed real vector-space. Under the embedding, the nonempty compact convex sets are mapped to points in the range space. In Rådström's construction, this embedding is additive and positively homogeneous. Rådström's approach used ideas from the theory of topological semi-groups. Later, Lars Hörmander proved a variant of this theorem for locally convex topological vector spaces using the support function (of convex analysis); in Hörmander's approach, the range of the embedding was the Banach lattice L_{1}, and the embedding was isotone.

Rådström characterized the generators of continuous semigroups of sets as compact convex sets.

== Students ==
Rådström's Ph.D. students included Per Enflo and Martin Ribe, both of whom wrote Ph.D. theses in functional analysis. In the uniform and Lipschitz categories of topological vector spaces, Enflo's results concerned spaces with local convexity, especially Banach spaces.

In 1970, Hans Rådström died of a heart attack. Enflo supervised one of Rådström's Linköping students, Lars-Erik Andersson, from 1970–1971, helping him with his 1972 thesis, On connected subgroups of Banach spaces, on Hilbert's fifth problem for complete, normed spaces. The Swedish functional analyst Edgar Asplund, then Professor of Mathematics at Aarhus University in Denmark, assisted Ribe as supervisor of his 1972 thesis, before dying of cancer in 1974. Ribe's results concerned topological vector spaces without assuming local convexity; Ribe constructed a counter-example to naive extensions of the Hahn–Banach theorem to topological vector spaces that lack local convexity.
