= Fritz Carlson =

Swedish mathematician (1888–1952)

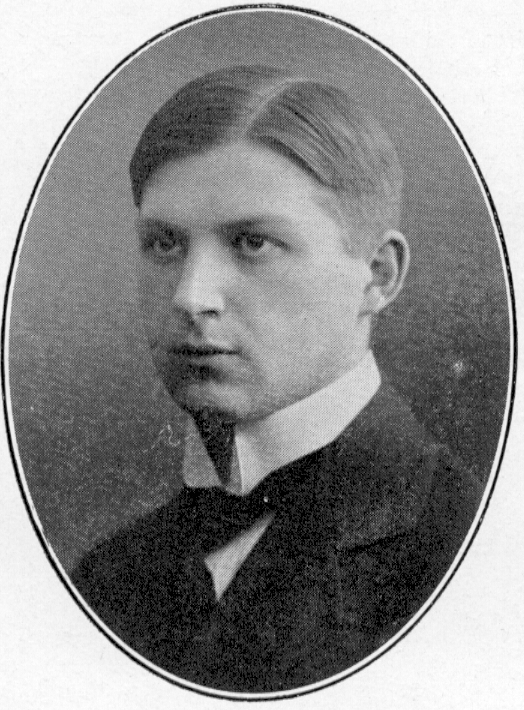
- Carlson in 1913
- Born: 23 July 1888; Vimmerby, Sweden
- Died: 28 November 1952 (aged 64); Stockholm, Sweden
- Education: Uppsala University
- Scientific career
- Fields: Mathematics
- Workplaces: Stockholm University
- Doctoral advisor: Anders Wiman
- Doctoral students: Germund Dahlquist; Tord Ganelius; Olof Hanner; Hans Rådström

Fritz David Carlson (23 July 1888 – 28 November 1952) was a Swedish mathematician whose work on analytic functions and geometry left a lasting mark on twentieth-century mathematics. After the death of Torsten Carleman, he headed the Mittag-Leffler Institute.

== Life and career ==
Born in Vimmerby on 23 July 1888, Fritz David Carlson completed his secondary schooling at Linköping in 1907 and went on to earn his doctorate at Uppsala University in 1914 with a thesis on a class of Taylor series whose coefficients vary analytically with the index. He was appointed professor of descriptive geometry at the Royal Institute of Technology in Stockholm in 1920 and in 1928 took up the chair of higher analysis at the Stockholm College of Advanced Studies.

From 1930 he served on the editorial board of Acta Mathematica, and after the death of Torsten Carleman in early 1949 he was entrusted with the administration of the Mittag-Leffler Institute at Djursholm. Carlson's research ranged from the arithmetic properties of power series to Dirichlet series (an infinite series with applications in number theory) and the Riemann zeta function (a function closely tied to the distribution of prime numbers), yielding theorems that remain standard references. He also authored a three-volume Swedish textbook series on elementary and spatial geometry (published 1943–48) and for thirty years acted as examiner for the Swedish secondary-school baccalaureate examination. Germund Dahlquist, Tord Ganelius, Olof Hanner and Hans Rådström were among his students.

Carlson's contributions to analysis include Carlson's theorem, Carlson's zero-density theorem for the zeros of the Riemann zeta function, the Pólya–Carlson theorem on rational functions, and Carlson's inequality:

$$\left( \sum_{n=1}^\infty |a_n|\right)^4 \leq \pi^2  \sum_{n=1}^\infty |a_n|^2 \, \sum_{n=1}^\infty n^2 |a_n|^2~.$$
