= Kalai's 3^d conjecture =

Maths conjecture

Unsolved problem in mathematics
Does every $d$-dimensional centrally symmetric polytope have at least $3^d$ nonempty faces?
More unsolved problems in mathematics

In geometry, more specifically in polytope theory, Kalai's 3^{d} conjecture is a conjecture on the polyhedral combinatorics of centrally symmetric polytopes, made by Gil Kalai in 1989. It states that every d-dimensional centrally symmetric polytope has at least 3^{d} nonempty faces (including the polytope itself as a face but not including the empty set).

== Examples ==
The cube and the regular octahedron, two examples for which the bound of the conjecture is tight.

In two dimensions, the simplest centrally symmetric convex polygons are the parallelograms, which have four vertices, four edges, and one polygon: 4 + 4 + 1 = 9 = 3^{2}. A cube is centrally symmetric, and has 8 vertices, 12 edges, 6 square sides, and 1 solid: 8 + 12 + 6 + 1 = 27 = 3^{3}. Another three-dimensional convex polyhedron, the regular octahedron, is also centrally symmetric, and has 6 vertices, 12 edges, 8 triangular sides, and 1 solid: 6 + 12 + 8 + 1 = 27 = 3^{3}.

In higher dimensions, the hypercube [0, 1]^{d} has exactly 3^{d} faces, each of which can be determined by specifying, for each of the d coordinate axes, whether the face projects onto that axis onto the point 0, the point 1, or the interval [0, 1]. More generally, every Hanner polytope has exactly 3^{d} faces. If Kalai's conjecture is true, these polytopes would be among the centrally symmetric polytopes with the fewest possible faces.

== Status ==
The conjecture is known to be true for $d\le 4$. It is also known to be true for simplicial polytopes: it follows in this case from a conjecture of Imre Bárány and László Lovász (1982) that every centrally symmetric simplicial polytope has at least as many faces of each dimension as the cross polytope, proven by Richard Stanley (1987). Indeed, these two previous papers were cited by Kalai as part of the basis for making his conjecture. Another special class of polytopes that the conjecture has been proven for are the Hansen polytopes of split graphs, which had been used by Ragnar Freij, Matthias Henze, and Moritz Schmitt et al. (2013) to disprove the stronger conjectures of Kalai.

The 3^{d} conjecture remains open for arbitrary polytopes in higher dimensions.

== Related conjectures ==
In the same work as the one in which the 3^{d} conjecture appears, Kalai conjectured more strongly that the f-vector of every convex centrally symmetric polytope P dominates the f-vector of at least one Hanner polytope H of the same dimension. This means that, for every number i from 0 to the dimension of P, the number of i-dimensional faces of P is greater than or equal to the number of i-dimensional faces of H. If it were true, this would imply the truth of the 3^{d} conjecture; however, the stronger conjecture was later disproven.

A related conjecture also attributed to Kalai is known as the full flag conjecture and asserts that the cube (as well as each of the Hanner polytopes) has the maximal number of (full) flags, that is, d!2^{d}, among all centrally symmetric polytopes.

Finally, both the 3^{d} conjecture and the full flag conjecture are sometimes said to be combinatorial analogues of the Mahler conjecture. All three conjectures claim the Hanner polytopes to minimize certain combinatorial or geometric quantities, have been resolved in similar special cases, but are widely open in general. In particular, the full flag conjecture has been resolved in some special cases using geometric techniques.
