= Rådström's embedding theorem =

Functional analysis theorem

In functional analysis, Rådström's embedding theorem is a result related to the set of compact and convex subsets of a normed vector space. It states that such sets can be isometrically embededded into a convex cone in another normed vector space.

The theorem is an important result in that it shows that this family of sets has natural linear and metric structures, which allows for simpler algebraic manipulations via the embedding. It was first proven by Hans Rådström in 1952.

An extension of Rådström's result to locally convex topological vector spaces, known as the Hörmander embedding theorem, was proven by Lars Hörmander in 1954.

== Preliminaries ==
=== $CK(X)$ and the Hausdorff metric ===
For any normed vector space $(X, || \cdot ||)$, let $CK(X)$ be the set of all its convex and compact subsets. We can endow $CK(X)$ with a metric structure given by the Hausdorff metric

$$d_H(A, B) = \sup_{x \in X} |d(x, A) - d(x, B)|,$$

where $d$ is the metric over $X$ induced by the norm $|| \cdot ||$, and $d(x, Y) = \inf_{y \in Y} d(x, y)$ is the distance from $x$ to a set $Y \subseteq X$. It is well known that $(CK(X), d_H)$ forms a metric space of its own right.

== Theorem ==
=== Main version ===
The main version of Rådström's theorem reads as follows:

Theorem (Rådström, 1952): Let $(X, || \cdot||)$ be a normed space. Then there exists a normed space $(Y, ||\cdot||_Y)$ such that the space $(CK(X), d_H)$ can be isometrically embedded into a convex cone $C \subseteq Y$. Furthermore, it is possible to construct a "minimal" $Y$ for which this holds. (Note: Minimal in the sense that for any other normed space $(Z, ||\cdot||_Z)$ into which $(CK(X), d_H)$ can be embedded, $(Y, ||\cdot||_Y)$ can also be embedded into a subspace of $(Z, ||\cdot||_Z)$ in which $(CK(X), d_H)$ was embedded.)

=== Extensions ===
It is possible to generalize Rådström's theorem to locally convex topological vector spaces (LCTVS). This is done via Hörmander's embedding theorem, proven by Lars Hörmander in 1954. Hörmander's theorem explicitly constructs an embedding via support functions of closed, convex, (strongly) bounded sets.

Theorem (Hörmander, 1954): let $X$ be a real LCTVS, and $CB(X)$ the set of all its closed, convex, (strongly) bounded subsets. Denoting by $X^*$ the dual space of $X$, consider the closed unit ball $\mathcal B^* \subseteq X^*$, and the Banach space $\mathcal C_b (\mathcal B^*)$ of all continuous, bounded functions $h :B^* \to \mathbb R$. For each $A \in CB(X)$, let $s_A \in \mathcal C_b (\mathcal B^*)$ defined by

$$s_A(x) = \sup_{y \in A} \langle x, y\rangle$$

be its support function. Then the mapping $H: CB(X) \to \mathcal C_b(\mathcal B^*)$ given by

$$A \mapsto s_A$$

is an isometric embedding into a convex cone in $\mathcal C_b(\mathcal B^*)$. Moreover, by the properties of support functions such embedding is also linear when $CB(X)$ is endowed with a vector-space structure given by the Minkowski sum and scalar multiplication.

== Applications ==
=== Integration of set-valued functions ===
The theorem can be used to define the integral of a set-valued function (or correspondence) via Debreu's integral. This has applications, for example, in the theory of random compact sets.
