= Olof Hanner =

Swedish mathematician

Olof Hanner (7 December 1922 in Stockholm – 19 September 2015 in Gothenburg) was a Swedish mathematician.

== Education and career ==
Hanner earned his Ph.D. under the supervision of Fritz Carlson from Stockholm University in 1952. He was a professor at the University of Gothenburg from 1963 to 1989.

== Contributions ==
In a 1956 paper, Hanner introduced the Hanner polytopes and the Hanner spaces having these polytopes as their metric balls. Hanner was interested in a Helly property of these shapes, later used to characterize them by Hansen & Lima (1981): unlike other convex polytopes, it is not possible to find three translated copies of a Hanner polytope that intersect pairwise but do not have a point of common intersection. Subsequently, the Hanner polytopes formed a class of important examples for the Mahler conjecture and for Kalai's 3^{d} conjecture. In another paper from the same year, Hanner proved a set of inequalities related to the uniform convexity of L^{p} spaces, now known as Hanner's inequalities.

Other contributions of Hanner include (with Hans Rådström) improving Werner Fenchel's version of Carathéodory's lemma, contributing to The Official Encyclopedia of Bridge, and doing early work on combinatorial game theory and the mathematics of the board game Go. One of the many proofs of the Pythagorean theorem based on the Pythagorean tiling is sometimes called "Olof Hanner's Jigsaw Puzzle".

== Selected publications ==
- Hanner, Olof (1951), "Some theorems on absolute neighborhood retracts", Arkiv för Matematik, 1 (5): 389–408, Bibcode:1951ArM.....1..389H, doi:10.1007/BF02591376, MR 0043459.
- Hanner, Olof; Rådström, Hans (1951), "A generalization of a theorem of Fenchel", Proceedings of the American Mathematical Society, 2 (4): 589–593, doi:10.2307/2032012, JSTOR 2032012, MR 0044142.
- Hanner, Olof (1956a), "Intersections of translates of convex bodies", Mathematica Scandinavica, 4: 65–87, doi:10.7146/math.scand.a-10456, MR 0082696.
- Hanner, Olof (1956b), "On the uniform convexity of L^{p} and ℓ^{p}", Arkiv för Matematik, 3 (3): 239–244, Bibcode:1956ArM.....3..239H, doi:10.1007/BF02589410, MR 0077087.
- Hanner, Olof (1959), "Mean play of sums of positional games", Pacific Journal of Mathematics, 9: 81–99, doi:10.2140/pjm.1959.9.81, MR 0104524.
- Hanner, Olof (1970), "Mathematics, A Solitary Game", The Two-Year College Mathematics Journal, 1 (2): 5–16, doi:10.2307/3027352, JSTOR 3027352.
- Hallén, Hans-Olof; Hanner, Olof; Jannersten, Per (1994), Rigal, Barry (ed.), Bridge movements: A fair approach, Bridgeakad. (Bridge academy) (Translated by Barry Rigal from the 1990 Swedish Tävlingsledaren (The leader of the tournament) ed.), Alvesta: Jannersten Forlag AB, ISBN 91-85024-86-4
