= Reuleaux triangle =

Curved triangle with constant width

The boundary of a Reuleaux triangle is a constant width curve based on an equilateral triangle. All points on a side are equidistant from the opposite vertex.

A Reuleaux triangle [ʁœlo] is a curved triangle with constant width, the simplest and best known curve of constant width other than the circle. It is formed from the intersection of three equally sized circular disks, each centered on the boundary of the other two. Constant width means that the separation of every two parallel supporting lines is the same, independent of their orientation. Because its width is constant, the Reuleaux triangle is one answer to the question "Other than a circle, what shape can a manhole cover be made so that it cannot fall down through the hole?"

They are named after Franz Reuleaux, a 19th-century German engineer who pioneered the study of machines for translating one type of motion into another, and who used Reuleaux triangles in his designs. However, these shapes were known before his time, for instance by the designers of Gothic church windows, by Leonardo da Vinci, who used it for a map projection, and by Leonhard Euler in his study of constant-width shapes. Other applications of the Reuleaux triangle include giving the shape to guitar picks, fire hydrant nuts, pencils, and drill bits for drilling filleted square holes, as well as in graphic design in the shapes of some signs and corporate logos.

Among constant-width shapes with a given width, the Reuleaux triangle has the minimum area and the sharpest (smallest) possible angle (120°) at its corners. By several numerical measures it is the farthest from being centrally symmetric. It provides the largest constant-width shape avoiding the points of an integer lattice, and is closely related to the shape of the quadrilateral maximizing the ratio of perimeter to diameter. It can perform a complete rotation within a square while at all times touching all four sides of the square, and has the smallest possible area of shapes with this property. However, although it covers most of the square in this rotation process, it fails to cover a small fraction of the square's area, near its corners. Because of this property of rotating within a square, the Reuleaux triangle is also sometimes known as the Reuleaux rotor.

The Reuleaux triangle is the first of a sequence of Reuleaux polygons whose boundaries are curves of constant width formed from regular polygons with an odd number of sides. Some of these curves have been used as the shapes of coins. The Reuleaux triangle can also be generalized into three dimensions in multiple ways: the Reuleaux tetrahedron (the intersection of four balls whose centers lie on a regular tetrahedron) does not have constant width, but can be modified by rounding its edges to form the Meissner tetrahedron, which does. Alternatively, the surface of revolution of the Reuleaux triangle also has constant width.

== Construction ==
To construct a Reuleaux triangle

The Reuleaux triangle may be constructed either directly from three circles, or by rounding the sides of an equilateral triangle.

The three-circle construction may be performed with a compass alone, not even needing a straightedge. By the Mohr–Mascheroni theorem the same is true more generally of any compass-and-straightedge construction, but the construction for the Reuleaux triangle is particularly simple. The first step is to mark two arbitrary points of the plane (which will eventually become vertices of the triangle), and use the compass to draw a circle centered at one of the marked points, through the other marked point. Next, one draws a second circle, of the same radius, centered at the other marked point and passing through the first marked point. Finally, one draws a third circle, again of the same radius, with its center at one of the two crossing points of the two previous circles, passing through both marked points. The central region in the resulting arrangement of three circles will be a Reuleaux triangle.

Alternatively, a Reuleaux triangle may be constructed from an equilateral triangle T by drawing three arcs of circles, each centered at one vertex of T and connecting the other two vertices. Or, equivalently, it may be constructed as the intersection of three disks centered at the vertices of T, with radius equal to the side length of T.

== Mathematical properties ==
Parallel supporting lines of a Reuleaux triangle

The most basic property of the Reuleaux triangle is that it has constant width, meaning that for every pair of parallel supporting lines (two lines of the same slope that both touch the shape without crossing through it) the two lines have the same Euclidean distance from each other, regardless of the orientation of these lines. In any pair of parallel supporting lines, one of the two lines will necessarily touch the triangle at one of its vertices. The other supporting line may touch the triangle at any point on the opposite arc, and their distance (the width of the Reuleaux triangle) equals the radius of this arc.

The first mathematician to discover the existence of curves of constant width, and to observe that the Reuleaux triangle has constant width, may have been Leonhard Euler. In a paper that he presented in 1771 and published in 1781 entitled De curvis triangularibus, Euler studied curvilinear triangles as well as the curves of constant width, which he called orbiforms.

=== Extremal measures ===
By many different measures, the Reuleaux triangle is one of the most extreme curves of constant width.

By the Blaschke–Lebesgue theorem, the Reuleaux triangle has the smallest possible area of any curve of given constant width. This area is

$$\frac{1}{2}(\pi - \sqrt3)s^2 \approx 0.705s^2,$$

where s is the constant width. One method for deriving this area formula is to partition the Reuleaux triangle into an inner equilateral triangle and three curvilinear regions between this inner triangle and the arcs forming the Reuleaux triangle, and then add the areas of these four sets. At the other extreme, the curve of constant width that has the maximum possible area is a circular disk, which has area $\pi s^2 / 4\approx 0.785s^2$.

The angles made by each pair of arcs at the corners of a Reuleaux triangle are all equal to 120°. This is the sharpest possible angle at any vertex of any curve of constant width. Additionally, among the curves of constant width, the Reuleaux triangle is the one with both the largest and the smallest inscribed equilateral triangles. The largest equilateral triangle inscribed in a Reuleaux triangle is the one connecting its three corners, and the smallest one is the one connecting the three midpoints of its sides. The subset of the Reuleaux triangle consisting of points belonging to three or more diameters is the interior of the larger of these two triangles; it has a larger area than the set of three-diameter points of any other curve of constant width.

Centrally symmetric shapes (outlined) inside and outside a Reuleaux triangle (orange), showing the latter's central asymmetry. In light brown, the triangle after inversion.

Although the Reuleaux triangle has sixfold dihedral symmetry, the same as an equilateral triangle, it does not have central symmetry. The Reuleaux triangle is the least symmetric curve of constant width according to two different measures of central asymmetry, the Kovner–Besicovitch measure (ratio of area to the largest centrally symmetric shape enclosed by the curve) and the Estermann measure (ratio of area to the smallest centrally symmetric shape enclosing the curve). For the Reuleaux triangle, the two centrally symmetric shapes that determine the measures of asymmetry are both hexagonal, although the inner one has curved sides. The Reuleaux triangle has diameters that split its area more unevenly than any other curve of constant width. That is, the maximum ratio of areas on either side of a diameter, another measure of asymmetry, is bigger for the Reuleaux triangle than for other curves of constant width.

Among all shapes of constant width that avoid all points of an integer lattice, the one with the largest width is a Reuleaux triangle. It has one of its axes of symmetry parallel to the coordinate axes on a half-integer line. Its width, approximately 1.54, is the root of a degree-6 polynomial with integer coefficients.

Just as it is possible for a circle to be surrounded by six congruent circles that touch it, it is also possible to arrange seven congruent Reuleaux triangles so that they all make contact with a central Reuleaux triangle of the same size. This is the maximum number possible for any curve of constant width.

An equidiagonal kite that maximizes the ratio of perimeter to diameter, inscribed in a Reuleaux triangle

Among all quadrilaterals, the shape that has the greatest ratio of its perimeter to its diameter is an equidiagonal kite that can be inscribed into a Reuleaux triangle.

=== Other measures ===
By Barbier's theorem all curves of the same constant width including the Reuleaux triangle have equal perimeters. In particular this perimeter equals the perimeter of the circle with the same width, which is $\pi s$.

The radii of the largest inscribed circle of a Reuleaux triangle with width s, and of the circumscribed circle of the same triangle, are

$$\displaystyle\left(1-\frac{1}{\sqrt 3}\right)s\approx 0.423s \quad \text{and} \quad \displaystyle\frac{s}{\sqrt 3}\approx 0.577s$$

respectively; the sum of these radii equals the width of the Reuleaux triangle. More generally, for every curve of constant width, the largest inscribed circle and the smallest circumscribed circle are concentric, and their radii sum to the constant width of the curve.

Unsolved problem in mathematics
How densely can Reuleaux triangles be packed in the plane?
More unsolved problems in mathematics

The optimal packing density of the Reuleaux triangle in the plane remains unproven, but is conjectured to be

$$\frac{2(\pi-\sqrt 3)}{\sqrt{15}+\sqrt{7}-\sqrt{12}} \approx 0.923,$$

which is the density of one possible double lattice packing for these shapes. The best proven upper bound on the packing density is approximately 0.947. It has also been conjectured, but not proven, that the Reuleaux triangles have the highest packing density of any curve of constant width.

=== Rotation within a square ===
Rotation of a Reuleaux triangle within a square, showing also the curve traced by the center of the triangle

Any curve of constant width can form a rotor within a square, a shape that can perform a complete rotation while staying within the square and at all times touching all four sides of the square. However, the Reuleaux triangle is the rotor with the minimum possible area. As it rotates, its axis does not stay fixed at a single point, but instead follows a curve formed by the pieces of four ellipses. Because of its 120° angles, the rotating Reuleaux triangle cannot reach some points near the sharper angles at the square's vertices, but rather covers a shape with slightly rounded corners, also formed by elliptical arcs.

One of the four ellipses followed by the center of a rotating Reuleaux triangle in a square

Ellipse separating one of the corners (lower left) of a square from the region swept by a rotating Reuleaux triangle

At any point during this rotation, two of the corners of the Reuleaux triangle touch two adjacent sides of the square, while the third corner of the triangle traces out a curve near the opposite vertex of the square. The shape traced out by the rotating Reuleaux triangle covers approximately 98.8% of the area of the square.

=== As a counterexample ===
Reuleaux's original motivation for studying the Reuleaux triangle was as a counterexample, showing that three single-point contacts may not be enough to fix a planar object into a single position. The existence of Reuleaux triangles and other curves of constant width shows that diameter measurements alone cannot verify that an object has a circular cross-section.

In connection with the inscribed square problem, Eggleston (1958) observed that the Reuleaux triangle provides an example of a constant-width shape in which no regular polygon with more than four sides can be inscribed, except the regular hexagon, and he described a small modification to this shape that preserves its constant width but also prevents regular hexagons from being inscribed in it. He generalized this result to three dimensions using a cylinder with the same shape as its cross section.

== Applications ==
=== Reaching into corners ===
Several types of machinery take the shape of the Reuleaux triangle, based on its property of being able to rotate within a square.

The Watts Brothers Tool Works square drill bit has the shape of a Reuleaux triangle, modified with concavities to form cutting surfaces. When mounted in a special chuck which allows for the bit not having a fixed centre of rotation, it can drill a hole that is nearly square. Although patented by Henry Watts in 1914, similar drills invented by others were used earlier. Other Reuleaux polygons are used to drill pentagonal, hexagonal, and octagonal holes.

Panasonic's RULO robotic vacuum cleaner has its shape based on the Reuleaux triangle in order to ease cleaning up dust in the corners of rooms.

=== Rolling cylinders ===
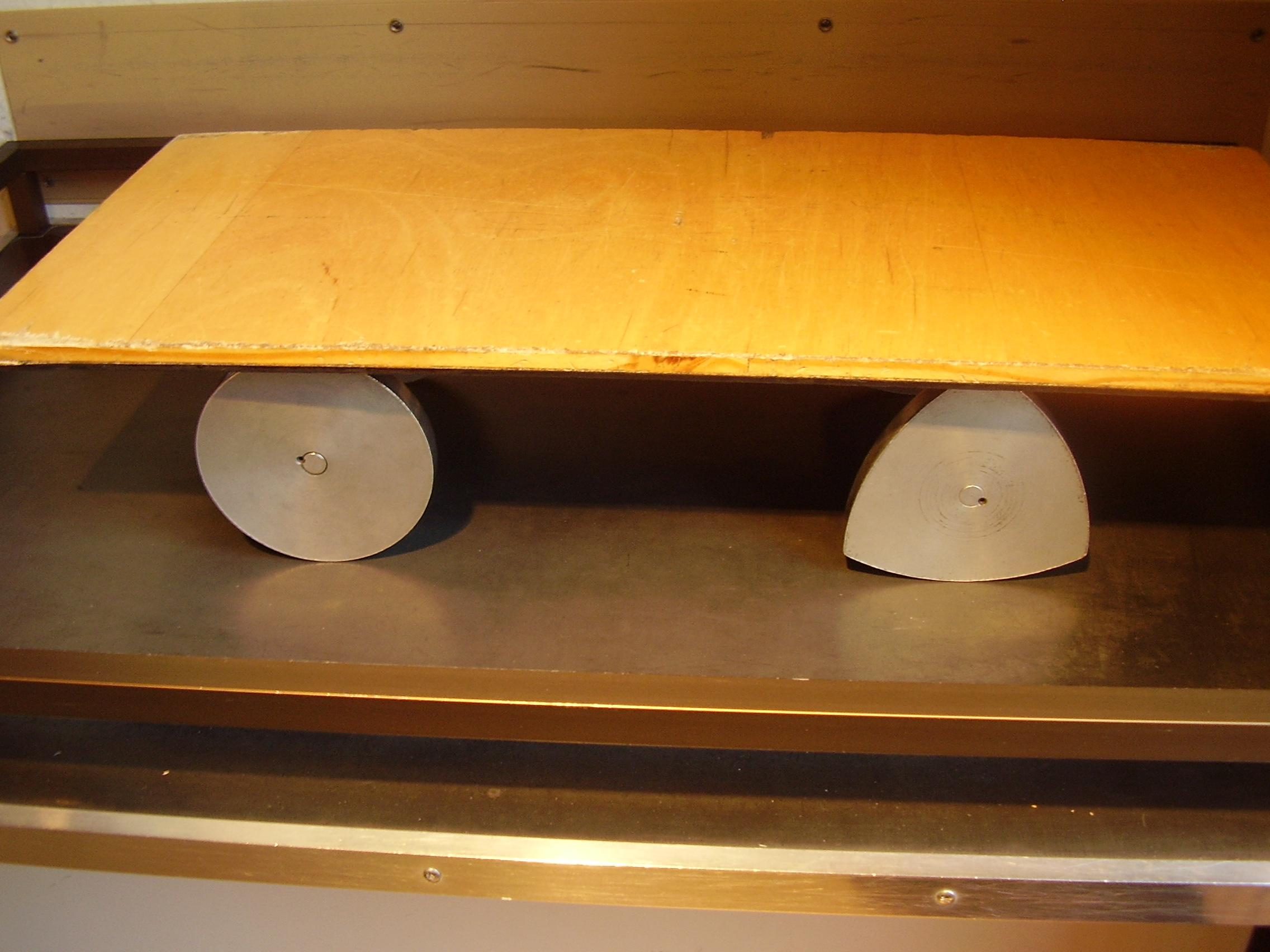
Comparison of a cylindrical and Reuleaux triangle roller

Another class of applications of the Reuleaux triangle involves cylindrical objects with a Reuleaux triangle cross section. Several pencils are manufactured in this shape, rather than the more traditional round or hexagonal barrels. They are usually promoted as being more comfortable or encouraging proper grip, as well as being less likely to roll off tables (since the center of gravity moves up and down more than a rolling hexagon).

A Reuleaux triangle (along with all other curves of constant width) can roll but makes a poor wheel because it does not roll about a fixed center of rotation. An object on top of rollers that have Reuleaux triangle cross-sections would roll smoothly and flatly, but an axle attached to Reuleaux triangle wheels would bounce up and down three times per revolution. This concept was used in a science fiction short story by Poul Anderson titled "The Three-Cornered Wheel". A bicycle with floating axles and a frame supported by the rim of its Reuleaux triangle shaped wheel was built and demonstrated in 2009 by Chinese inventor Guan Baihua, who was inspired by pencils with the same shape.

=== Mechanism design ===
Film advance mechanism in the Soviet Luch-2 8mm film projector based on a Reuleaux triangle

Another class of applications of the Reuleaux triangle involves using it as a part of a mechanical linkage that can convert rotation around a fixed axis into reciprocating motion. These mechanisms were studied by Franz Reuleaux. With the assistance of the Gustav Voigt company, Reuleaux built approximately 800 models of mechanisms, several of which involved the Reuleaux triangle. Reuleaux used these models in his pioneering scientific investigations of their motion. Although most of the Reuleaux–Voigt models have been lost, 219 of them have been collected at Cornell University, including nine based on the Reuleaux triangle. However, the use of Reuleaux triangles in mechanism design predates the work of Reuleaux; for instance, some steam engines from as early as 1830 had a cam in the shape of a Reuleaux triangle.

One application of this principle arises in a film projector. In this application, it is necessary to advance the film in a jerky, stepwise motion, in which each frame of film stops for a fraction of a second in front of the projector lens, and then much more quickly the film is moved to the next frame. This can be done using a mechanism in which the rotation of a Reuleaux triangle within a square is used to create a motion pattern for an actuator that pulls the film quickly to each new frame and then pauses the film's motion while the frame is projected.

The rotor of the Wankel engine is shaped as a curvilinear triangle that is often cited as an example of a Reuleaux triangle. However, its curved sides are somewhat flatter than those of a Reuleaux triangle and so it does not have constant width.

=== Architecture ===
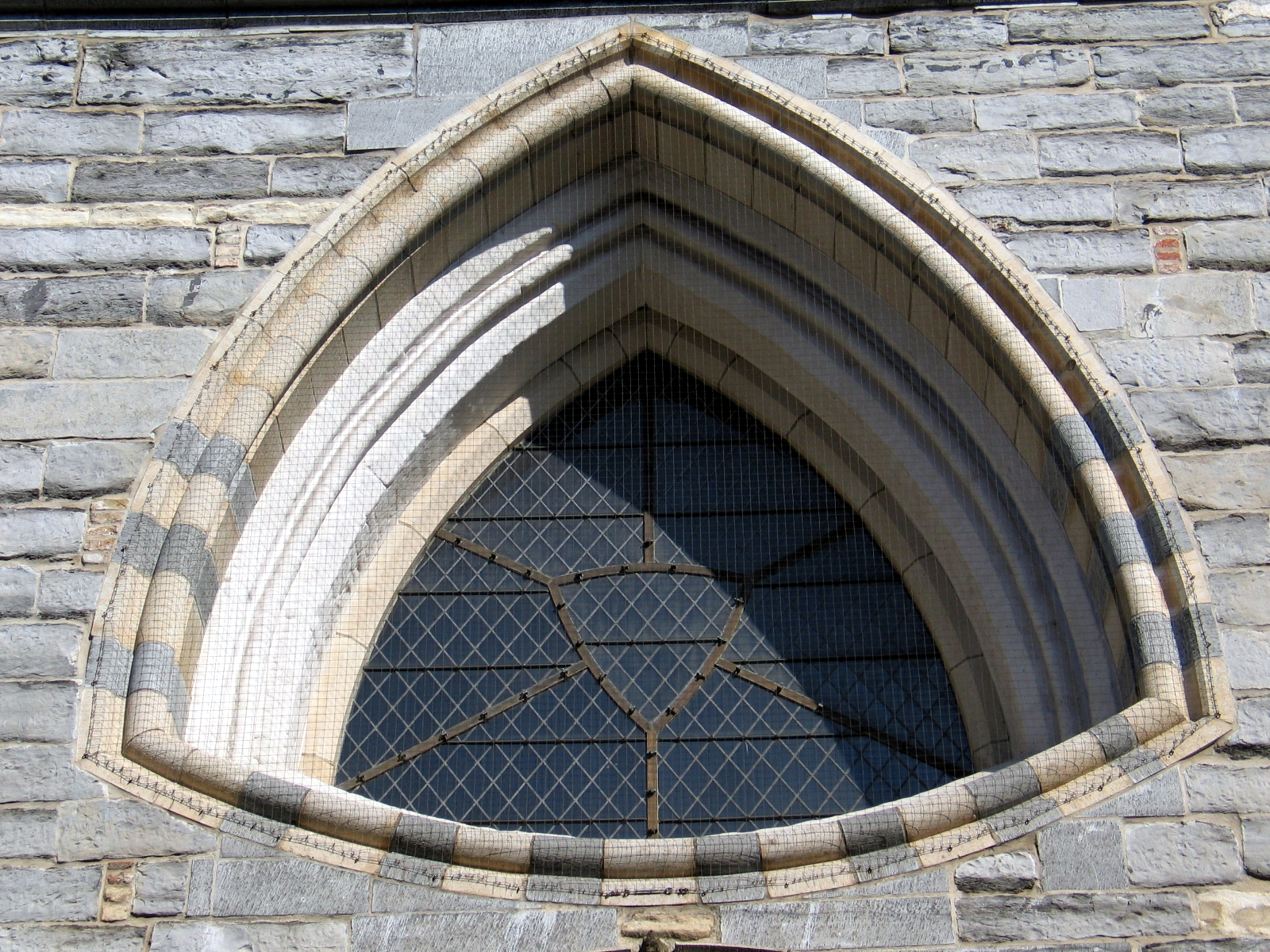
Reuleaux triangle shaped window of the Church of Our Lady, Bruges in Belgium

In Gothic architecture, beginning in the late 13th century or early 14th century, the Reuleaux triangle became one of several curvilinear forms frequently used for windows, window tracery, and other architectural decorations. For instance, in English Gothic architecture, this shape was associated with the decorated period, both in its geometric style of 1250–1290 and continuing into its curvilinear style of 1290–1350. It also appears in some of the windows of the Milan Cathedral. In this context, the shape is sometimes called a spherical triangle, which should not be confused with spherical triangle meaning a triangle on the surface of a sphere. In its use in Gothic church architecture, the three-cornered shape of the Reuleaux triangle may be seen both as a symbol of the Trinity, and as "an act of opposition to the form of the circle".

The Reuleaux triangle has also been used in other styles of architecture. For instance, Leonardo da Vinci sketched this shape as the plan for a fortification. Modern buildings that have been claimed to use a Reuleaux triangle shaped floorplan include the MIT Kresge Auditorium, the Kölntriangle, the Donauturm, the Torre de Collserola, and the Mercedes-Benz Museum. However in many cases these are merely rounded triangles, with different geometry than the Reuleaux triangle.

=== Mapmaking ===
Another early application of the Reuleaux triangle, da Vinci's world map from circa 1514, was a world map in which the spherical surface of the earth was divided into eight octants, each flattened into the shape of a Reuleaux triangle.

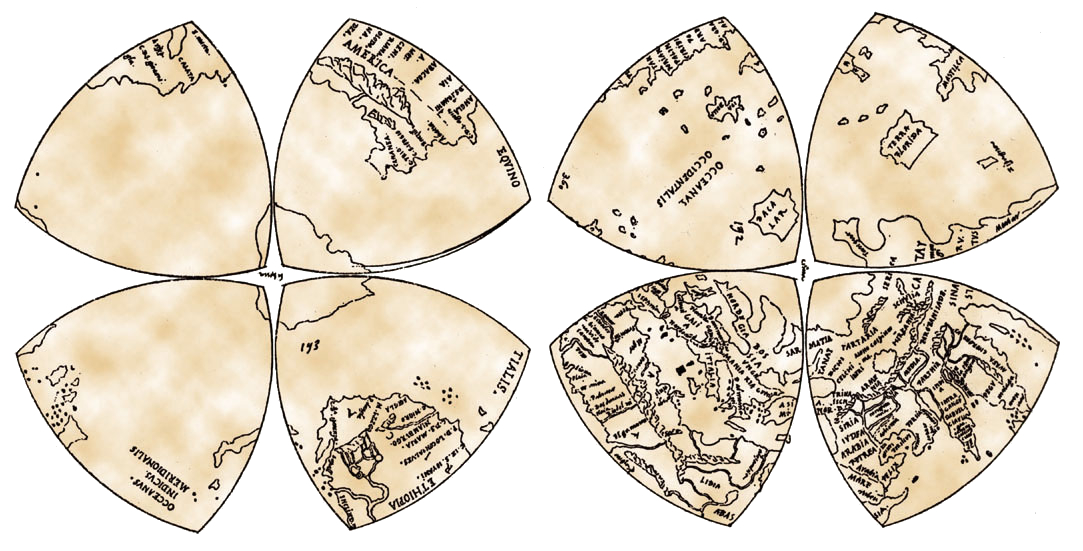
Leonardo da Vinci's world map in eight Reuleaux-triangle quadrants

Similar maps also based on the Reuleaux triangle were published by Oronce Finé in 1551 and by John Dee in 1580.

=== Other objects ===
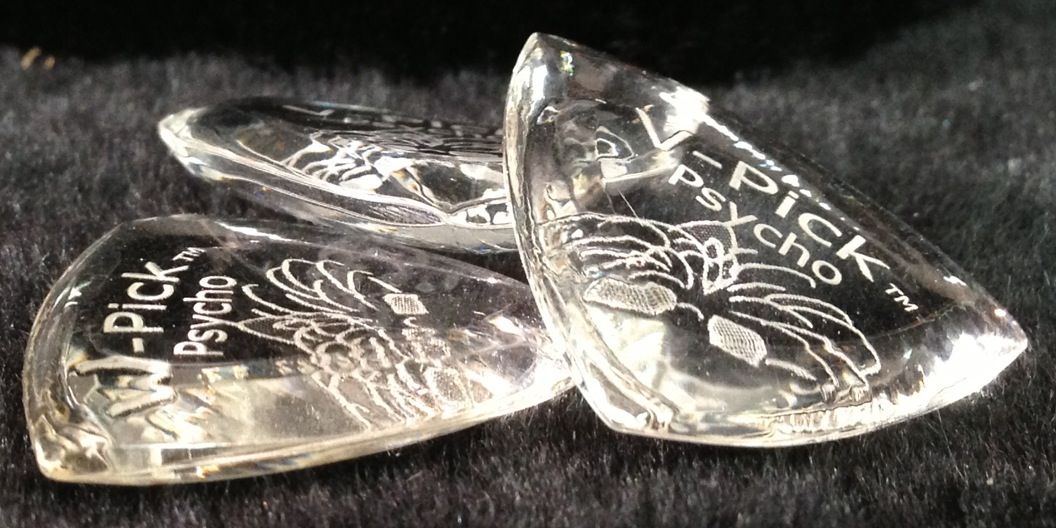
Reuleaux triangle shaped guitar picks

Many guitar picks employ the Reuleaux triangle, as its shape combines a sharp point to provide strong articulation, with a wide tip to produce a warm timbre. Because all three points of the shape are usable, it is easier to orient and wears less quickly compared to a pick with a single tip.

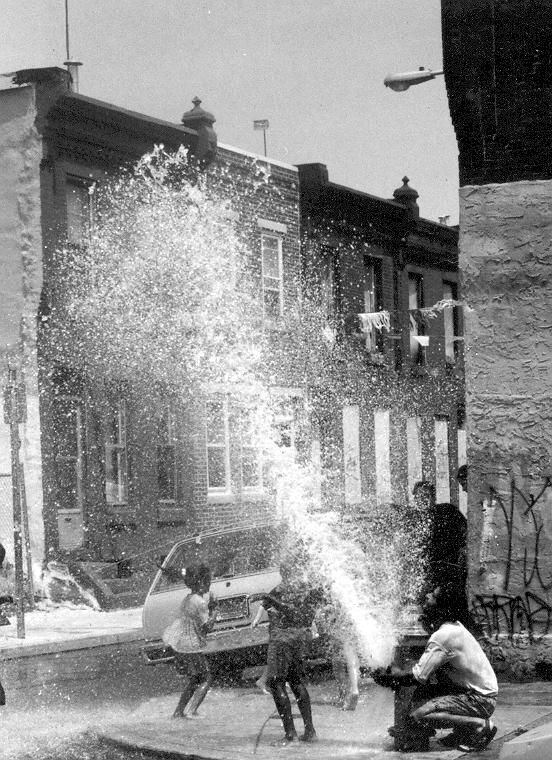
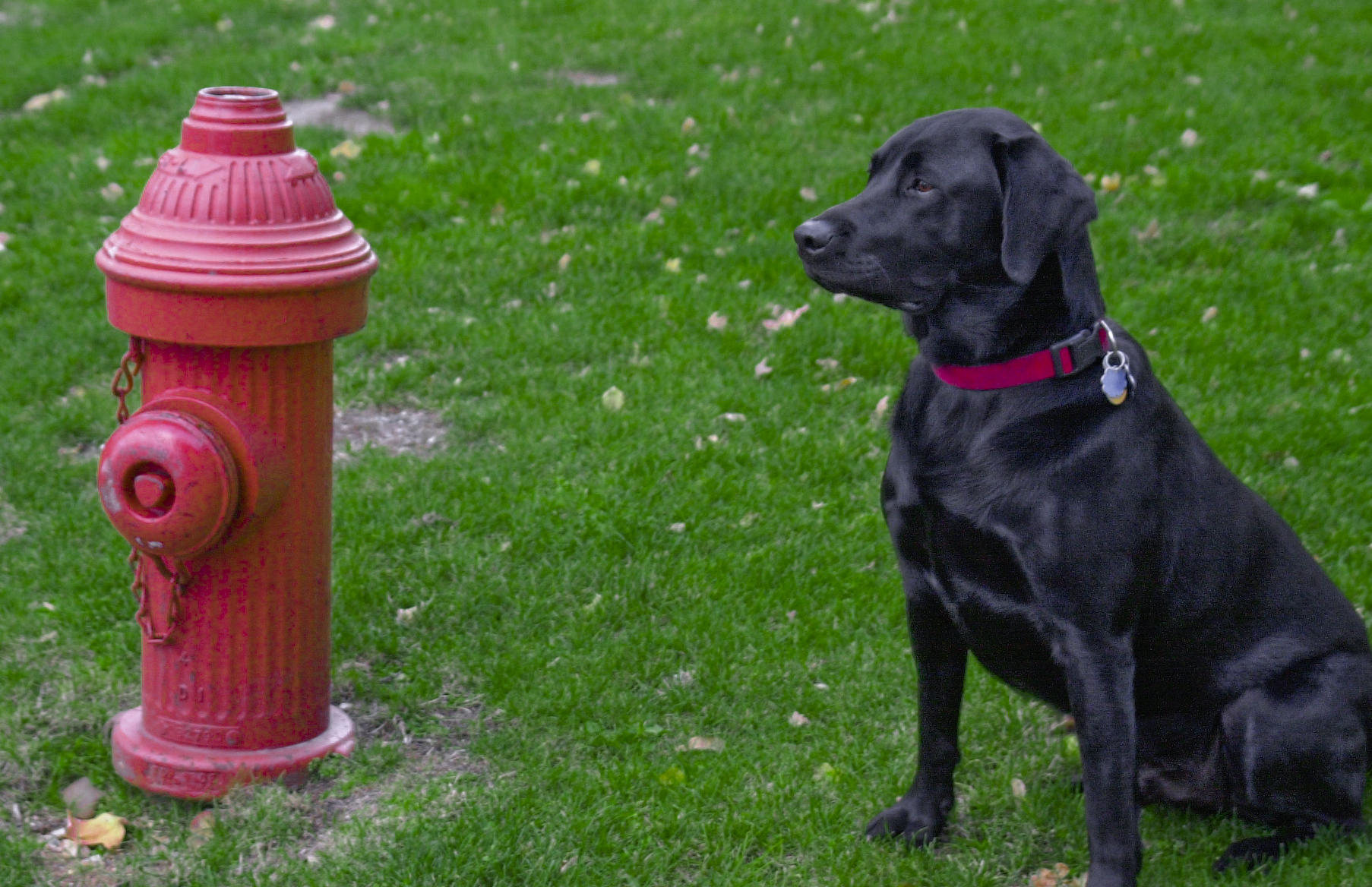
Illicit use of a fire hydrant, Philadelphia, 1996, and a newer Philadelphia hydrant with a Reuleaux triangle shaped nut to prevent such use.

The Reuleaux triangle has been used as the shape for the cross section of a fire hydrant valve nut. The constant width of this shape makes it difficult to open the fire hydrant using standard parallel-jawed wrenches; instead, a wrench with a special shape is needed. This property allows the fire hydrants to be opened only by firefighters (who have the special wrench) and not by other people trying to use the hydrant as a source of water for other activities.

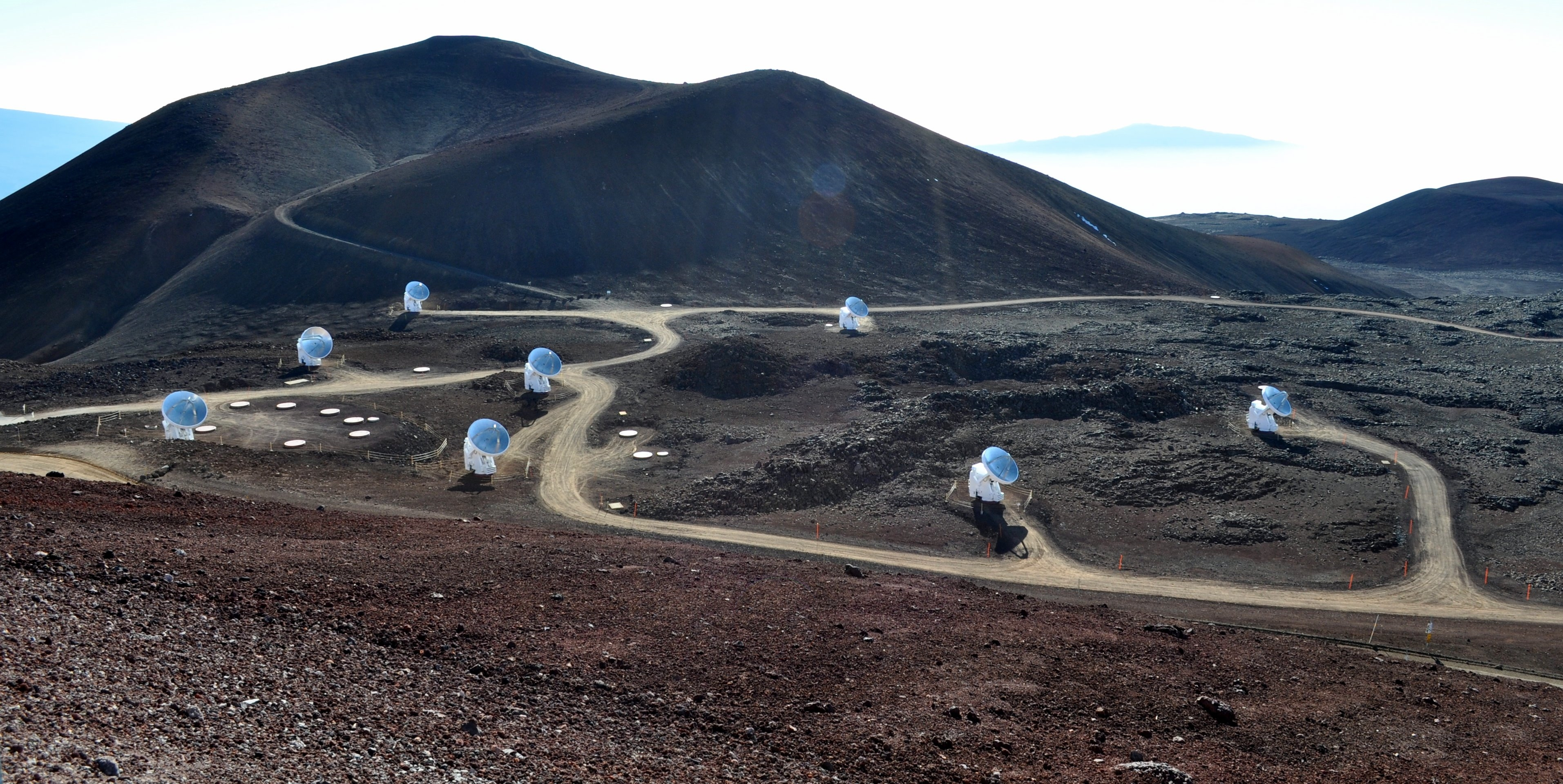
The Submillimeter Array, with seven of its eight antennae arranged on an approximate Reuleaux triangle

Following a suggestion of Keto (1997), the antennae of the Submillimeter Array, a radio-wave astronomical observatory on Mauna Kea in Hawaii, are arranged on four nested Reuleaux triangles. Placing the antennae on a curve of constant width causes the observatory to have the same spatial resolution in all directions, and provides a circular observation beam. As the most asymmetric curve of constant width, the Reuleaux triangle leads to the most uniform coverage of the plane for the Fourier transform of the signal from the array. The antennae may be moved from one Reuleaux triangle to another for different observations, according to the desired angular resolution of each observation. The precise placement of the antennae on these Reuleaux triangles was optimized using a neural network. In some places the constructed observatory departs from the preferred Reuleaux triangle shape because that shape was not possible within the given site.

=== Signs and logos ===
The shield shapes used for many signs and corporate logos feature rounded triangles. However, only some of these are Reuleaux triangles.

The corporate logo of Petrofina (Fina), a Belgian oil company with major operations in Europe, North America and Africa, used a Reuleaux triangle with the Fina name from 1950 until Petrofina's merger with Total S.A. (today TotalEnergies) in 2000. Another corporate logo framed in the Reuleaux triangle, the south-pointing compass of Bavaria Brewery, was part of a makeover by design company Total Identity that won the SAN 2010 Advertiser of the Year award. The Reuleaux triangle is also used in the logo of Colorado School of Mines.

In the United States, the National Trails System and United States Bicycle Route System both mark routes with Reuleaux triangles on signage.

=== In nature ===
The Reuleaux triangle as the central bubble in a mathematical model of a four-bubble planar soap bubble cluster

According to Plateau's laws, the circular arcs in two-dimensional soap bubble clusters meet at 120° angles, the same angle found at the corners of a Reuleaux triangle. Based on this fact, it is possible to construct clusters in which some of the bubbles take the form of a Reuleaux triangle.

The shape was first isolated in crystal form in 2014 as Reuleaux triangle disks. Basic bismuth nitrate disks with the Reuleaux triangle shape were formed from the hydrolysis and precipitation of bismuth nitrate in an ethanol–water system in the presence of 2,3-bis(2-pyridyl)pyrazine.

== Generalizations ==
Triangular curves of constant width with smooth rather than sharp corners may be obtained as the locus of points at a fixed distance from the Reuleaux triangle. Other generalizations of the Reuleaux triangle include surfaces in three dimensions, curves of constant width with more than three sides, and the Yanmouti sets which provide extreme examples of an inequality between width, diameter, and inradius.

=== Three-dimensional version ===
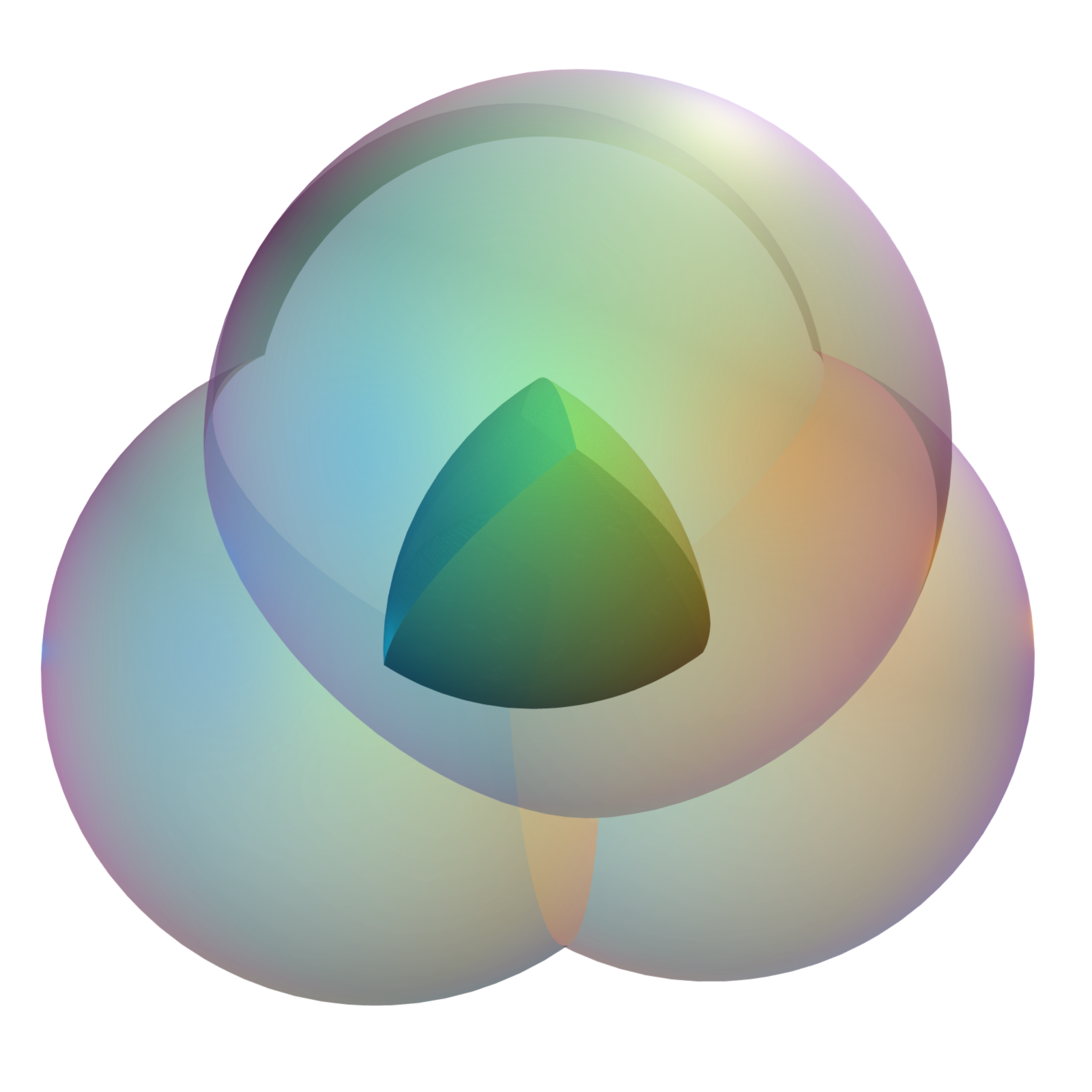
Four balls intersect to form a Reuleaux tetrahedron.

The intersection of four balls of radius s centered at the vertices of a regular tetrahedron with side length s is called the Reuleaux tetrahedron, but its surface is not a surface of constant width. It can, however, be made into a surface of constant width, called Meissner's tetrahedron, by replacing three of its edge arcs by curved surfaces, the surfaces of rotation of a circular arc. Alternatively, the surface of revolution of a Reuleaux triangle through one of its symmetry axes forms a surface of constant width, with minimum volume among all known surfaces of revolution of given constant width.

=== Reuleaux polygons ===
Reuleaux polygons

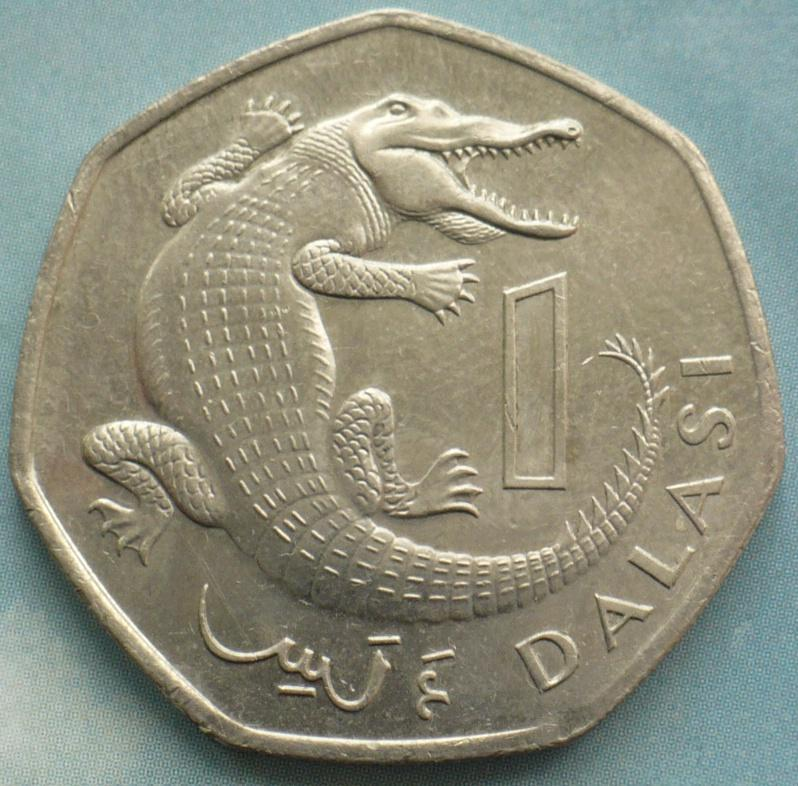
Gambian dalasi Reuleaux heptagon coin

The Reuleaux triangle can be generalized to regular or irregular polygons with an odd number of sides, yielding a Reuleaux polygon, a curve of constant width formed from circular arcs of constant radius. The constant width of these shapes allows their use as coins that can be used in coin-operated machines. Although coins of this type in general circulation usually have more than three sides, a Reuleaux triangle has been used for a commemorative coin from Bermuda.

Similar methods can be used to enclose an arbitrary simple polygon within a curve of constant width, whose width equals the diameter of the given polygon. The resulting shape consists of circular arcs (at most as many as sides of the polygon), can be constructed algorithmically in linear time, and can be drawn with compass and straightedge. Although the Reuleaux polygons all have an odd number of circular-arc sides, it is possible to construct constant-width shapes with an even number of circular-arc sides of varying radii.

=== Yanmouti sets ===
The Yanmouti sets are defined as the convex hulls of an equilateral triangle together with three circular arcs, centered at the triangle vertices and spanning the same angle as the triangle, with equal radii that are at most equal to the side length of the triangle. Thus, when the radius is small enough, these sets degenerate to the equilateral triangle itself, but when the radius is as large as possible they equal the corresponding Reuleaux triangle. Every shape with width w, diameter d, and inradius r (the radius of the largest possible circle contained in the shape) obeys the inequality

$$w - r \le \frac{d}{\sqrt 3},$$

and this inequality becomes an equality for the Yanmouti sets, showing that it cannot be improved.

== Related figures ==
Triquetra interlaced to form a trefoil knot

Comparison of associated Reuleaux triangle (red hatching), triquetra (blue) and vesica piscis (teal)

In the classical presentation of a three-set Venn diagram as three overlapping circles, the central region (representing elements belonging to all three sets) takes the shape of a Reuleaux triangle. The same three circles form one of the standard drawings of the Borromean rings, three mutually linked rings that cannot, however, be realized as geometric circles. Parts of these same circles are used to form the triquetra, a figure of three overlapping semicircles (each two of which form a vesica piscis symbol) that again has a Reuleaux triangle at its center; just as the three circles of the Venn diagram may be interlaced to form the Borromean rings, the three circular arcs of the triquetra may be interlaced to form a trefoil knot.

Relatives of the Reuleaux triangle arise in the problem of finding the minimum perimeter shape that encloses a fixed amount of area and includes three specified points in the plane. For a wide range of choices of the area parameter, the optimal solution to this problem will be a curved triangle whose three sides are circular arcs with equal radii. In particular, when the three points are equidistant from each other and the area is that of the Reuleaux triangle, the Reuleaux triangle is the optimal enclosure.

Circular triangles are triangles with circular-arc edges, including the Reuleaux triangle as well as other shapes. The deltoid curve is another type of curvilinear triangle, but one in which the curves replacing each side of an equilateral triangle are concave rather than convex. It is not composed of circular arcs, but may be formed by rolling one circle within another of three times the radius. Other planar shapes with three curved sides include the arbelos, which is formed from three semicircles with collinear endpoints, and the Bézier triangle.

The Reuleaux triangle may also be interpreted as the stereographic projection of one triangular face of a spherical tetrahedron, the Schwarz triangle of parameters $\tfrac32, \tfrac32, \tfrac32$ with spherical angles of measure $120^\circ$ and sides of spherical length ${\arccos}\bigl({-\tfrac13}\bigr).$
