= Abram Besicovitch =

Russian mathematician (1891–1970)

- Born: Abram Samoilovitch Besicovitch; 24 January 1891; Berdyansk, Russian Empire
- Died: 2 November 1970 (aged 79); Cambridge, UK
- Education: St Petersburg University
- Known for: Hausdorff–Besicovitch dimension Kovner–Besicovitch measure Besicovitch covering theorem Besicovitch inequality Besicovitch functions Besicovitch set
- Awards: Adams Prize (1930); De Morgan Medal (1950); Sylvester Medal (1952); Fellow of the Royal Society
- Scientific career
- Fields: Mathematics
- Workplaces: University of Liverpool; University of Cambridge
- Doctoral advisor: Andrey Markov
- Doctoral students: Joseph Gillis; Patrick Moran; Gholamhossein Mosaheb

Abram Samoilovitch Besicovitch (or Besikovitch; Russian: Абра́м Само́йлович Безико́вич; 23 January 1891 – 2 November 1970) was a Russian mathematician. He was professor at Cambridge University and worked mainly in analysis.

== Life and career ==
Abram Besicovitch was born in Berdyansk on the Sea of Azov (now in Ukraine) to a Karaite Jewish family. He studied under the supervision of Andrey Markov at the Saint Petersburg Imperial University, graduating with a PhD in 1912, and then began research in probability theory. He converted to Eastern Orthodoxy, joining the Russian Orthodox Church, on marrying in 1916. Besicovitch was appointed professor at the University of Perm in 1917, and was caught up in the Russian Civil War over the next two years. In 1920, he took a position at his alma mater, now renamed the Petrograd State University.

In 1924, he went to Copenhagen on a Rockefeller Fellowship, where he worked on almost periodic functions under Harald Bohr. A type of function space in that field now bears his name. After a visit to G.H. Hardy at the University of Oxford, he had appointments at the University of Liverpool in 1926, and the University of Cambridge in 1927.

Besicovitch moved to Cambridge University in 1927, where he was made a Fellow of Trinity College. He was appointed Lecturer in the Faculty of Mathematics, and therefore received recognition as a Cambridge MA by 'Special Grace' on 24 November 1928. In 1950, he became J.E. Littlewood's successor as the Rouse Ball Chair of Mathematics. He retired in 1958 and toured the US for eight years. After returning to Trinity, he died in 1970 in Cambridge.

== Work ==
Besicovitch worked mainly on combinatorial methods and questions in real analysis, such as the Kakeya needle problem and the Hausdorff–Besicovitch dimension, two areas that have grown in importance in recent years. The Kovner–Besicovitch measure of the central symmetry of planar convex sets is also named after him.

He was also a major influence on the economist Piero Sraffa, after 1940, when they were both Fellows of Trinity, and on Dennis Lindley, one of the founders of the Bayesian movement in the United Kingdom.

== Awards and honours ==
Besicovitch was in 1934 made FRS and in 1952 won the Sylvester Medal from the Royal Society. He received in 1950 the De Morgan Medal of the London Mathematical Society. He was a visiting scholar at the Institute for Advanced Study in the fall of 1954.

Besicovitch's candidacy for the Royal Society reads:

"Distinguished as a pure mathematician, particularly for his researches in the theory of functions of a real variable, the theory of analytic functions, and the theory of almost periodic functions."

The asteroid 16953 Besicovitch is named in his honour.

A portrait of Besicovitch by Eve Goldsmith Coxeter is in the collection of Trinity College, Cambridge.

== Quotation ==
- A mathematician's reputation rests on the number of bad proofs he has given.
