= Kovner–Besicovitch measure =

The largest centrally symmetric subset (central shaded region) of a Reuleaux triangle and its reflection across the center of symmetry of the subset

In plane geometry the Kovner–Besicovitch measure is a number defined for any bounded convex set describing how close to being centrally symmetric it is. It is the fraction of the area of the set that can be covered by its largest centrally symmetric subset.

== Properties ==
This measure is one for a set that is centrally symmetric, and less than one for sets whose closure is not centrally symmetric. It is invariant under affine transformations of the plane. If $c$ is the center of symmetry of the largest centrally-symmetric set within a given convex body $K$, then the centrally-symmetric set itself is the intersection of $K$ with its reflection across $c$.

== Minimizers ==
The convex sets with the smallest possible Kovner–Besicovitch measure are the triangles, for which the measure is 2/3. The result that triangles are the minimizers of this measure is known as Kovner's theorem or the Kovner–Besicovitch theorem, and the inequality bounding the measure above 2/3 for all convex sets is the Kovner–Besicovitch inequality. The curve of constant width with the smallest possible Kovner–Besicovitch measure is the Reuleaux triangle.

== Computational complexity ==
The Kovner–Besicovitch measure of any given convex polygon with $n$ vertices can be found in time $O(n\log n)$ by determining a translation of the reflection of the polygon that has the largest possible overlap with the unreflected polygon.

== History ==
Branko Grünbaum writes that the Kovner–Besicovitch theorem was first published in Russian, in a 1935 textbook on the calculus of variations by Mikhail Lavrentyev and Lazar Lyusternik, where it was credited to Soviet mathematician and geophysicist S. S. Kovner. Additional proofs were given by Abram Samoilovitch Besicovitch and by István Fáry, who also proved that every minimizer of the Kovner–Besicovitch measure is a triangle.

== See also ==
- Estermann measure, a measure of central symmetry defined using supersets in place of subsets
