= Watts Brothers Tool Works =

American tool manufacturer

- Headquarters: Wilmerding, Pennsylvania, United States

Watts Brothers Tool Works is a tool manufacturer located in Wilmerding, Pennsylvania. They are known for manufacturing drill bits that can drill square holes, including blind holes, which cannot be made with other methods such as broaching. The Harry Watts square drill bit is based on a Reuleaux triangle shape. It is used together with a guide and a particular chuck to make a square hole. Similarly, the company also manufactures drill bits for other angular holes such as pentagons and hexagons.
