= Integral of a correspondence =

In mathematics, the integral of a correspondence is a generalization of the integration of single-valued functions to correspondences (i.e., set-valued functions).

The first notion of the integral of a correspondence is due to Aumann in 1965, with a different approach by Debreu appearing in 1967. Integrals of correspondences have applications in general equilibrium theory in mathematical economics, random sets in probability theory, partial identification in econometrics, and fuzzy numbers in fuzzy set theory.

== Preliminaries ==
=== Correspondences ===
A correspondence $\varphi: X \rightrightarrows Y$ is a function $\varphi : X \rightarrow \mathcal{P} (Y)$, where $\mathcal{P} (Y)$ is the power set of $Y$. That is, $\varphi$ assigns each point $x \in X$ with a set $\varphi(x) \subset Y$.

=== Selections ===
A selection $f$ of a correspondence $\varphi: X \rightrightarrows Y$ is a function $f: X \rightarrow Y$ such that $f(x) \in \varphi(x)$ for every $x \in X$.

If $X$ can be seen as a measure space $(X, \mathcal X, \mu)$ and $Y$ as a Banach space $(Y, || \cdot ||)$, then one can define a measurable selection $f$ as an $\mathcal X$-measurable function (Note: Measurable in the sense of Bochner measurable: there exists a sequence $(\psi_n)_n$ of simple functions from $X$ to $Y$ such that $\lim_{n \to \infty} ||f(x) - \psi_n(x)|| = 0$ for μ-almost all $x \in X$.) $f$ such that $f(x) \in \varphi(x)$ for μ-almost all $x \in X$. (Note: A stronger definition sometimes used requires $f$ to be measurable and $f(x) \in \varphi(x)$ for all $x \in X$.)

== Definitions ==
=== The Aumann integral ===
Let $(X, \mathcal X, \mu)$ be a measure space and $(Y, ||\cdot ||)$ a Banach space. If $\varphi : X\rightrightarrows Y$ is a correspondence, then the Aumann integral of $\varphi$ is defined as

$$\int_X \varphi d \mu := \left\{\int_X f d \mu : f \text{ is a measurable selection of } \varphi\right\}$$

where the integrals $\int_X f d \mu$ are Bochner integrals.

Example: let the underlying measure space be $([0,1], \mathcal L, \lambda)$, and a correspondence $\varphi: [0,1] \rightrightarrows \mathbb R$ be defined as $\varphi(x) = \{2, 3\}$ for all $x \in [0,1]$. Then the Aumman integral of $\varphi$ is $\int_X \varphi d \lambda = [2, 3]$.

=== The Debreu integral ===
Debreu's approach to the integration of a correspondence is more restrictive and cumbersome, but directly yields extensions of usual theorems from the integration theory of functions to the integration of correspondences, such as Lebesgue's Dominated convergence theorem. It uses Rådström's embedding theorem to identify convex and compact valued correspondences with subsets of a real Banach space, over which Bochner integration is straightforward.

Let $(X, \mathcal X, \mu)$ be a measure space, $(Y, ||\cdot ||)$ a Banach space, and $\mathcal K \subset \mathcal P(Y)$ the set of all its convex and compact subsets. Let $\varphi: X \to \mathcal K$ be a convex and compact valued correspondence from $X$ to $Y$. By Rådström's embedding theorem, $\mathcal K$ can be isometrically embedded as a convex cone $C$ in a real Banach space $(\mathcal Y, || \cdot ||_{\mathcal Y})$, in such a way that addition and multiplication by nonnegative real numbers in $\mathcal Y$ induces the corresponding operation in $\mathcal K$.

Let $\varphi^*: X \rightrightarrows C$ be the "image" of $\varphi$ under the embedding defined above, in the sense that $\varphi^*(x) \subset C$ is the image of $\varphi(x)$ under this embedding for every $x \in X$. For each pair of $\mathcal X$-simple functions $f, g : X \to C$, define the metric $\Delta(f, g) = \int_X ||f - g||_{\mathcal Y} d \mu$.

Then we say that $\varphi$ is integrable if $\varphi^*$ is integrable in the following sense: there exists a sequence of $\mathcal X$-simple functions $(f_n)_n$ from $X$ to $C$ which are Cauchy in the metric $\Delta$ and converge in measure to $\varphi^*$. In this case, we define the integral of $\varphi^*$ to be

$$\int_X \varphi^* d \mu := \lim_{n \to \infty} \int_X f_n d \mu \in C$$

where the integrals $\int_X f_n d \mu$ are again simply Bochner integrals in the space $(\mathcal Y, || \cdot ||_{\mathcal Y})$, and the result still belongs $C$ since it is a convex cone. We then uniquely identify the Debreu integral of $\varphi$ as

$$\int_X \varphi d \mu := E  \in \mathcal K$$

such that $E^* = \int_X \varphi^* d \mu \in C$. Since every embedding is injective and surjective onto its image, the Debreu integral is unique and well-defined.
