= Besicovitch inequality =

In mathematics, the Besicovitch inequality is a geometric inequality relating volume of a set and distances between certain subsets of its boundary. The inequality was first formulated by Abram Besicovitch.

== Definition ==
Consider the n-dimensional cube $[0,1]^n$ with a Riemannian metric $g$. Let

$d_i= dist_g(\{x_i=0\}, \{x_i=1\})$

denote the distance between opposite faces of the cube. The Besicovitch inequality asserts that

$\prod_i d_i \leq Vol([0,1]^n,g)$

The inequality can be generalized in the following way. Given an n-dimensional Riemannian manifold M with connected boundary and a smooth map $f: M \rightarrow [0,1]^n$, such that the restriction of f to the boundary of M is a degree 1 map onto $\partial [0,1]^n$, define

$d_i= dist_M(f^{-1}(\{x_i=0\}), f^{-1}(\{x_i=1\}))$

Then $\prod_i d_i \leq Vol(M)$.

The Besicovitch inequality was used to prove systolic inequalities on surfaces.
