= Supporting functional =

In convex analysis and mathematical optimization, the supporting functional is a generalization of the supporting hyperplane of a set.

== Mathematical definition ==
Let X be a locally convex topological space, and $C \subset X$ be a convex set, then the continuous linear functional $\phi: X \to \mathbb{R}$ is a supporting functional of C at the point $x_0$ if $\phi \not=0$ and $\phi(x) \leq \phi(x_0)$ for every $x \in C$.

== Relation to support function ==
If $h_C: X^* \to \mathbb{R}$ (where $X^*$ is the dual space of $X$) is a support function of the set C, then if $h_C\left(x^*\right) = x^*\left(x_0\right)$, it follows that $h_C$ defines a supporting functional $\phi: X \to \mathbb{R}$ of C at the point $x_0$ such that $\phi(x) = x^*(x)$ for any $x \in X$.

== Relation to supporting hyperplane ==
If $\phi$ is a supporting functional of the convex set C at the point $x_0 \in C$ such that

$$\phi\left(x_0\right) = \sigma = \sup_{x \in C} \phi(x) > \inf_{x \in C} \phi(x)$$

then $H = \phi^{-1}(\sigma)$ defines a supporting hyperplane to C at $x_0$.
