= Hanner's inequalities =

Mathematical results

In mathematics, Hanner's inequalities are results in the theory of L^{p} spaces. Their proof was published in 1956 by Olof Hanner. They provide a simpler way of proving the uniform convexity of L^{p} spaces for p ∈ (1, +∞) than the approach proposed by James A. Clarkson in 1936.

== Statement of the inequalities ==
Let f, g ∈ L^{p}(E), where E is any measure space. If p ∈ [1, 2], then

$$\|f+g\|_p^p + \|f-g\|_p^p \geq \big( \|f\|_p + \|g\|_p \big)^p + \big| \|f\|_p-\|g\|_p \big|^p.$$

The substitutions F = f + g and G = f − g yield the second of Hanner's inequalities:

$$2^p \big( \|F\|_p^p + \|G\|_p^p \big) \geq \big( \|F+G\|_p + \|F-G\|_p \big)^p + \big| \|F+G\|_p-\|F-G\|_p \big|^p.$$

For p ∈ [2, +∞) the inequalities are reversed (they remain non-strict).

Note that for $p = 2$ the inequalities become equalities which are both the parallelogram rule.
