= Barrier cone =

In mathematics, specifically functional analysis, the barrier cone is a cone associated to any non-empty subset of a Banach space. It is closely related to the notions of support functions and polar sets.

== Definition ==
Let X be a Banach space and let K be a non-empty subset of X. The barrier cone of K is the subset b(K) of X^{∗}, the continuous dual space of X, defined by

$$b(K) := \left\{ \ell \in X^{\ast} \,\left|\, \sup_{x \in K} \langle \ell, x \rangle < + \infty \right. \right\}.$$

== Related notions ==
The function

$$\sigma_{K} \colon \ell \mapsto \sup_{x \in K} \langle \ell, x \rangle,$$

defined for each continuous linear functional ℓ on X, is known as the support function of the set K; thus, the barrier cone of K is precisely the set of continuous linear functionals ℓ for which σ_{K}(ℓ) is finite.

The set of continuous linear functionals ℓ for which σ_{K}(ℓ) ≤ 1 is known as the polar set of K. The set of continuous linear functionals ℓ for which σ_{K}(ℓ) ≤ 0 is known as the (negative) polar cone of K. Clearly, both the polar set and the negative polar cone are subsets of the barrier cone.
