= Academic ranks in Sweden =

This article describes the academic positions and ranks in Sweden.

== Overview ==
The academic terminology for titles and positions at universities in Sweden includes the following:

- Adjunkt – A university teaching position, often part-time, that requires at least a bachelor's degree but does not require a PhD; similar to the adjunct instructor and in some cases to assistant professor in the USA, lecturer in the UK.
- Doktor – An academic title that entails a research education, typically involving publication of scientific articles and successful defense of a doctoral thesis; equivalent of a PhD
- Forskarassistent – Post-doctoral fellow, a temporary (max four years) research position that requires a PhD, and typically undertaken following a PhD in order to qualify as a Docent; no or very limited teaching obligations. There have been no new positions since 2018 (except at private universities), the position is essentially replaced by the position ‘’Biträdande lektor’’ (similar to assistant professor, entry-level faculty position with teaching and research)
- Biträdande universitetslektor - An entry-level teaching position that requires a PhD; broadly similar to assistant professor in the USA and Lecturer in the UK.
- Lektor or universitetslektor – A senior teaching position; broadly similar to associate professor in the USA and Senior Lecturer in the UK.
- Docent – An academic qualification that requires a PhD, and typically entails documented scientific independence via additional publications beyond those required for a PhD, teaching experience, and training in teaching and scientific mentorship. The title of Docent is typically a formal requirement for being a main supervisor for PhD students and for serving as a member of an examination committee for evaluation of a doctoral thesis. In Germany, Docent is broadly equivalent to Dr. Habil. In Denmark, it is broadly equivalent to Dr. Phil. The US and UK systems lack a qualification corresponding to Docent. The qualification is occasionally incorrectly translated to "associate professor," which indicates a tenured position in the US system rather than a qualification.
- Professor – Requires a PhD degree, a strong publication record, proven teaching skills, and supervision as main supervisor of PhD students who have obtained PhDs. It is similar to a tenured, senior, full professor in the US. The exception being Professors of artistic subjects that can be appointed without the requirement of a PhD.

In Sweden only full Professors are referred to as Professors. All others are referred to by their academic rank or academic degree.

== Background ==
In Sweden, academic ranks and their corresponding required skills in teaching and research are defined in the University Law (SFS 1993:100) and the University Ordinance (SFS 1992:1434). The hiring of and promotion to the rank of professor is assessed in committee before being decided upon by the appropriate university official, usually the head of the department (prefekt), dean (dekan) or head of the university (rektor). The assessment is based on the views of two or more external reviewers. Decisions are frequently appealed to the Appeals Board for Swedish Universities and Colleges (Överklagandenämnden för Högskolan). A similar procedure, albeit with different requirements, is used before the title of docent, which can be awarded, or the employment of a lektor.

== Academic ranks ==
In general, the Swedish system of academic ranks contains two intertwined career ladders; one based on teaching merits, the other based on research merits. The teaching ladder starts with adjunct instructor (adjunkt), continues with lecturer (lektor), and ends with professor. The research ladder starts with PhD student (doktorand), continues with PhD (doktor), several years of one or more postdoctoral positions (forskarassistent), assistant professor (‘’lektor’') equivalent to Lecturer in the U.K., associate professor (docent) equivalent to Senior Lecturer in the U.K., and ends with professor. All titles, except for the PhD degree (doktor) and the associate professor title (docent), are tied to a given employment position.

There are also official translations of the names of these positions.

== Proposed changes ==
The Swedish Government Official Report (SOU 2007:98) on Academic Career Pathways published in December 2007 proposed several changes to the here described structure.

=== Professor ===
Previously, only holders of a chair of an academic department had the title professor, but, since the 1990s, a second career path has been opened, allowing qualified lecturers to apply for promotion. A successful evaluation automatically confers the title of professor. Regardless of the hiring mechanism, to qualify as a professor, the applicant must have a PhD degree, a strong publication record, proven teaching skills, and have served as the main supervisor for PhD students who have successfully obtained their PhD. The title of professor in Sweden is similar to a senior, full professor in the USA. Professors promoted to their title enjoy most of the advantages of a directly appointed professor. However, the institution receives no extra funding for research work. Both unions and universities agree that this must change over time, but progress has been slow. While the professorship once was for life, it is now merely an employment. A professor who resigns or is let go loses the title.

Since 1 January 2011 the individual right to be promoted to professor is removed from the general university legislation. It is instead delegated to the respective university and the local rules governing employment positions. Usually there is still a possibility for promotion, but the right to be promoted, as the previous legislation was, is removed.

=== Tillförordnad professor / Adjungerad professor / Gästprofessor ===
Acting professor, adjunct professor and visiting professor are all temporary professor positions used to solve the need for a certain competence or a managerial resource, often in collaboration with commercial industry, or the public health care system. An adjunct professor usually works on a part-time basis (typically less than 50%) and has their main employment elsewhere. As the positions are limited in duration, individuals are usually directly recruited without any competitive selection process. Despite the lack of competition, the formal requirements typical coincide with the requirements necessary to be appointed as professor.

=== Docent ===
A docent is an academic postdoctoral qualification, closely related to the Habilitation found in certain countries in Europe. A docent requires a PhD and typically must have documented scientific independence in the form of additional publications beyond those required for a PhD, as well as teaching experience, and training in both teaching and scientific mentorship. The title docent is not an employment position, but rather a competency level ("habilitation") required to be the main supervisor of a doctoral student, or to serve as a member of the committee that assesses the defense of a PhD thesis. Through research and teaching experience, the docent earns venia docendi, the right to teach. Accordingly, a docent may teach at all levels and be appointed by the faculty as opponent at a PhD Thesis defence. Typically, a docent manages a group of PhD students or a subdivision of a research group. While once a formal position obtainable through an excellent grade on the PhD dissertation, today PhDs apply to be an unpaid docent, meaning that they keep their current employment but are awarded the title docent in recognition of their level of academic competency. Individuals retain the docent title for life, but if appointed to the rank of professor, the title is dropped as redundant.

=== Lektor / Universitetslektor ===
This teaching position typically requires a PhD, and is similar to a tenured associate professor in the USA. A position as lektor requires proven pedagogical and scientific skills, usually being understood as teaching experience during PhD studies and successful defence of a PhD thesis. Although lecturers are typically promised a 50/50 partition between research and teaching, for those lecturers unable to find external funding it is largely a teaching position. Coursework includes all levels, but lecturers do not necessarily act as examiners at the PhD level. As with professors, a promotion procedure can be applied for junior staff that qualify. Administrative or pedagogical skills can substitute for a lack in research work, if combined with long service. Today, almost all lecturer positions require a PhD degree. Depending on the university, qualification as lektor may be the required level of employment to participate in academic elections, as well as to stand for the offices of dean (dekan) or head of the university (rektor). The term lektor is a position of employment.

=== Postdoktor / Forskare / Forskarassistent ===
The titles of postdoktor (post-doctoral researcher), forskare (researcher) or forskarassistent (post-doctoral fellow) are time-limited positions (maximum four years) allowing researchers to continue their research.

A postdoctoral position usually entails working under the supervision of a senior researcher, such as forskarassistent, docent or professor.

The title of forskarassistent (‘’post-doctoral research fellow) should not be confused with the title of forskningsassistent (research assistant’'), which is a junior position for a doctoral student. In contrast, a forskarassistent was a common entry position of the institutional professorship ladder, but with no or limited teaching obligations. Deprived of state funding since 2010, no new positions as ‘’forskarassistent’’ can be created since 2018.

Post-doctoral fellows (‘’forskarassistent’') can be lab and group leaders and usually carry out independent research, especially when they have been given substantial grants. In some Swedish institutions, however, the title was used to circumvent restrictions on the time that such institutions can hire postdoctoral fellows and thus are not necessarily related to their academic maturity, capability to undertake independent research or show any proof of ability to attract funds to their projects.

=== Doktor ===
This is an academic title that entails a research education, typically involving publication of scientific articles and successful defense of a doctoral thesis. It is equivalent of a PhD degree.

=== Adjunkt ===
Adjunkt is a teaching position, often part-time, that requires at least a bachelor's degree, may require a master's degree, and does not require a PhD degree. It is similar to an adjunct instructor in the USA. The adjunkt may have teaching responsibilities at the undergraduate and masters levels. While the adjunkt is common at both universities and colleges, some universities are striving to upgrade adjunkts to lektors. This can be done by allowing the adjunkt time to perform or complete PhD studies, or by systematically replacing adjunkts who have quit or retired with positions as lektors.

=== Doktorand ===
An individual working to obtain a PhD degree; a PhD student. The Faculty Board may not accept PhD students unless they can prove that the relevant finances are available to support the student. While employment as doktorand is unpopular with faculty for economical reasons, it is widely demanded by student organizations and acknowledge in law. The position as doktorand does not per se distinguish between those students who are employed and those benefiting from public or private grants. It is common to prolong the doktorand employment or scholarship period by teaching as adjunkt or doing other work for the department. Such work cannot exceed 20% of a full-time position, bringing the four year PhD programme to a total of five years.

=== Emeritus rank ===
The emeritus rank is most commonly used for retired professors, although there is no particular regulation prohibiting a lektor to add the letters em after their title.

== Administrative ranks ==
There is also a structure that the ranks of administrative positions follow. These administrative positions form a hierarchy on top of all academics based on a managerial system called "new public management," so the administrators have all the power to make all the decisions from who will be hired or fired to who will teach what or who is allowed to do research. There is no tenure in the Swedish academia. Instead what they advertise as "permanent" positions are in fact "until further notice" (tillsvidare in Swedish). When the managers want to fire an academic, it is possible to do it regardless of rank, years of service, or any other qualification.

=== Rektor, vice-chancellor (GB), President (US) ===
Most universities and colleges being state institutions, the vice-chancellor is appointed by Government. The appointment is for six years, renewable for two times three years. However, while directors general of all other departments and authorities are parachuted from above, no vice-chancellor is appointed without the board of the university's recommendation. This, in turn, is based on the opinion of lektors, professors and students. A formal account of the hearing process, including aspects of equal opportunity, is part of the recommendation sent to the Government. Vice-chancellor hold the rank of lektor or higher. The private colleges follow a very similar procedure, but with appointment being made either by Government or by the board itself.

=== Prorektor ===
The board of the university appoints a prorector for the university, who serves as acting rector during the rector's vacation, travels and other absences. The position is proscribed in law; prorektors usually hold the rank of lektor or higher.

=== Vice-rektor, deputy vice-chancellor (GB), vice president (US) ===
Several of the large universities have adopted an organization where vice president hold a specific office as the presidents's chargé d'affaires in a particular domain. The office of vice president is not proscribed in law. Procedures and requirements for election as well as missions have therefore varied widely between institutions. Responsibilities include, but are not limited to, Student's Welfare, Education Quality, Off-Campus Programmes, Corporate Affairs, Information Technology and Internationalisation. Vice president usually hold the rank of lektor or higher, but again, this may vary between institutions.

=== Dekan, Dekanus, Pro dekan, vice dekan ===
While the internal organization of the higher education institutions are not regulated by law, most have opted to divide into faculties or areas headed by a board and a dekan or dekanus, the dean. A pro dean is usually a person with the task of assisting a dean and being the dean's deputy when he is absent. A vice dean has rather been given a special area of responsibility within a faculty, e.g. collaboration with the surrounding society or internationalization. Deans, pro deans and vice deans are commonly appointed by the rector after hearing the opinion of the lektors and professors. They usually serve with a time-limited mandate. Deans, pro deans and vice deans hold the rank of lektor or higher.

=== Prefekt ===
Most universities and colleges are subdivided into departments, headed by the prefekt and the department board or, sometimes, by the prefekt alone. Prefekts may be appointed by and report directly to the department board, the faculty board or the rector. There are no formal requirements for a prefekt, but adjunkts who have been a prefekt usually hold a position as lektor or higher.
