= Tord Ganelius =

Swedish mathematician

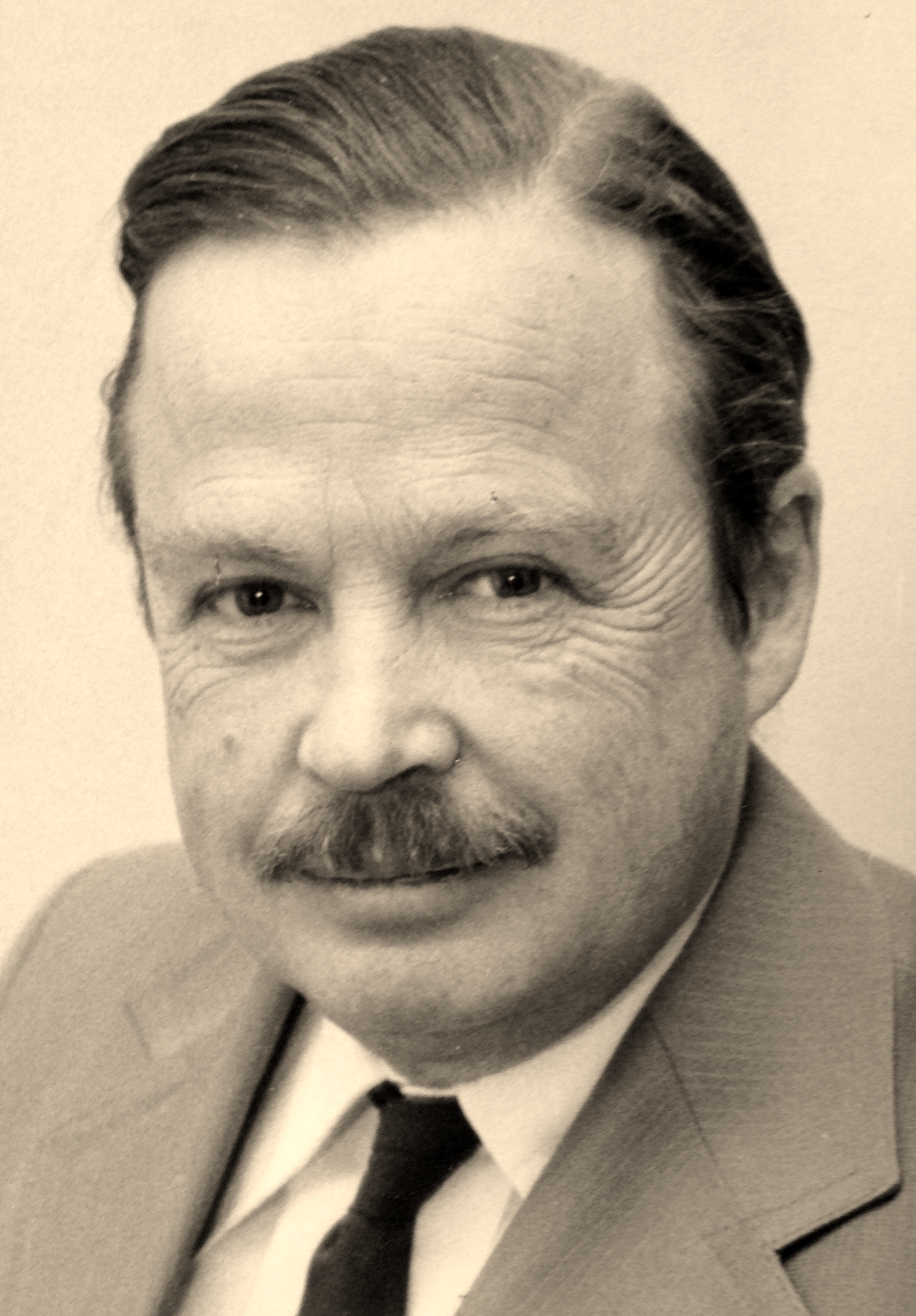
Tord Ganelius

Tord Hjalmar Ganelius (born 23 May 1925 in Stockholm, dead 14 March 2016 in Stockholm) was a Swedish mathematician and professor emeritus. He served as Permanent Secretary of the Royal Swedish Academy of Sciences and was a board member of the Nobel Foundation from 1981 to 1989. His primary research interests were holomorphic functions and approximation theory.

== Education and career ==
Ganelius completed his Ph.D. in 1953 at Stockholms Högskola (known as Stockholm University since 1960) by presenting his dissertation Sequences of Analytic Functions and Their Zeros.

He was an associate professor at Lund University in 1953–56 and in 1957 he was appointed Professor of Mathematics at University of Gothenburg, where he served until 1981. During this time he was Dean of the Faculty of Science twice, in 1963–65 and 1977–80. In 1972, he was elected a member of the Royal Swedish Academy of Sciences and he was appointed the permanent secretary in 1981, a position he held until 1989. He was a board member of the Nobel Foundation from 1981 to 1989, and every October he announced the Nobel Laureates in Physics, Chemistry and Economic Sciences.

Tord Ganelius has also been a visiting professor at the University of Washington in 1962, Cornell University in 1967–68 and the University of California, San Diego in 1972–73.

In 1966, Ganelius published the Swedish-language mathematics textbook ”Introduktion till matematiken”, which since 2006 has been available on-line.

== Family ==
Tord Ganelius is the son of Hjalmar and Ebba G. In 1951 he married Aggie Hemberg (born 1928). They have four children: Per (1952), Truls (1955), Svante (1957) and Aggie Öhman (1963).
