= Barry Hanner =

American operatic baritone

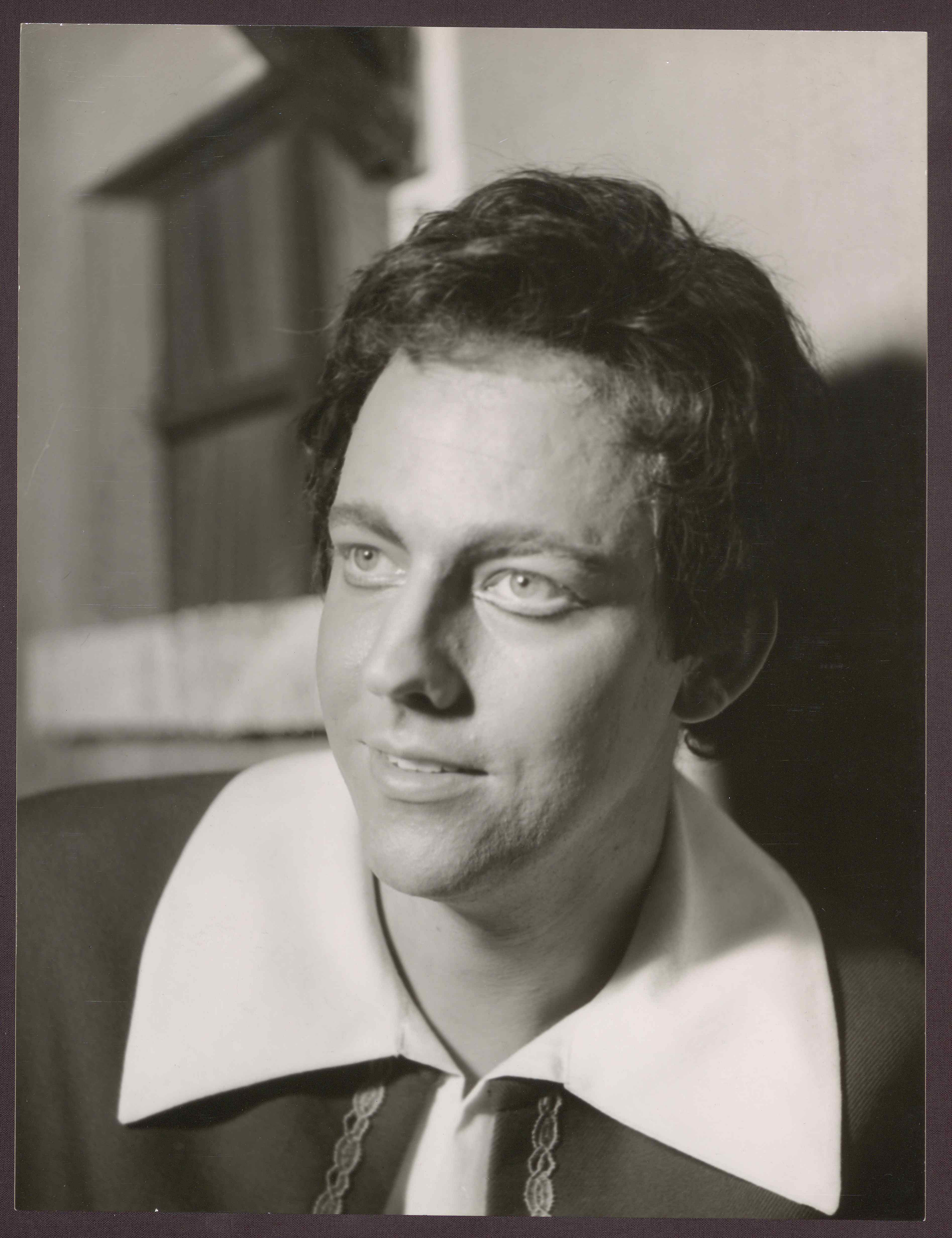
- Born: February 20, 1936; Bloomington, Indiana, U.S.
- Died: July 26, 2025 (aged 89); Neumarkt in der Oberpfalz, Germany
- Education: Curtis Institute of Music
- Occupation: Operatic singer

Barry Hanner (February 20, 1936 – July 26, 2025) was an American operatic baritone based in Germany from the 1960s onwards. He performed in operas by Luigi Nono, Hans Werner Henze, and Bernd Alois Zimmermann, and he also directed Otello by Giuseppe Verdi in Cyprus.
