= Support function =

Distance from origin of tangent hyperplanes

In mathematics, the support function h_{A} of a non-empty closed convex set A in $\mathbb{R}^n$ describes the (signed) distances of supporting hyperplanes of A from the origin. The support function is a convex function on $\mathbb{R}^n$. Any non-empty closed convex set A is uniquely determined by h_{A}. Furthermore, the support function, as a function of the set A, is compatible with many natural geometric operations, like scaling, translation, rotation and Minkowski addition. Due to these properties, the support function is one of the most central basic concepts in convex geometry.

== Definition ==
The support function $h_A\colon\mathbb{R}^n\to\mathbb{R}$ of a non-empty closed convex set A in $\mathbb{R}^n$ is given by

$$h_A(x)=\sup\{ x\cdot a: a\in A\}.$$

== Interpretation ==
=== Unit vectors ===
The interpretation of the support function is most intuitive when $x$ is a unit vector. By definition, the convex set $A$ is contained in the closed half-space

$$\{y\in\mathbb{R}^n: y\cdot x \leqslant h_A(x) \}$$

and there is at least one point of $A$ in the boundary

$$H(x)= \{y\in\mathbb{R}^n: y\cdot x = h_A(x) \}$$

of this half-space. The hyperplane $H(x)$ is therefore a supporting hyperplane with exterior unit normal vector $x$. The word exterior is important here, as the orientation of x plays a role, the set H(x) is in general different from H(−x). In this specific case, $h_A(x)$ represents the signed physical Euclidean distance from the origin to the supporting hyperplane $H(x)$.

=== Non-unit vectors as scoring rates ===
For an arbitrary, non-unit vector $x \neq 0$, the support function value $h_A(x)$ no longer represents a direct spatial distance. Instead, it can be interpreted as a total score achievable on $A$ governed by a scoring determined by $x$. In this framework, the vector $x$ functions as an evaluation operator where each element acts as a weighting factor. The inner product $x \cdot a$ is a linear machine that converts a spatial position vector $a \in A$ into a scalar score. The magnitude $||x||_2$ defines the sensitivity of this machine, representing how many score units are accumulated per meter of physical displacement in the direction of $x$.

Under this interpretation, the support function value $h_A(x)$ is the maximum possible score that can be achieved by any point within the set $A$ along the direction $x$. The supporting hyperplane $H(x) = \{y \in \mathbb{R}^n : x \cdot y = h_A(x)\}$ represents the collection of all points in space that achieve this exact maximum score threshold. The true physical distance $d$ from the origin to the supporting hyperplane is determined by dividing the maximum accumulated score by the scoring rate:

$$d = \frac{h_A(x)}{||x||_2}$$

This perspective provides an intuitive foundation for the positive homogeneity property of the support function, $h_A(\alpha x) = \alpha h_A(x)$ for $\alpha \ge 0$. Scaling the vector $x$ by a factor of $\alpha$ does not alter the physical geometry or boundary of the underlying set $A$, meaning the supporting hyperplane remains in the exact same physical location. Instead, scaling $x$ multiplies the scoring sensitivity (the exchange rate) by $\alpha$. As a result, the maximum score threshold $h_A(x)$ scales by $\alpha$ purely as an artifact of the adjusted measuring criteria.

== Examples ==
The support function of a singleton A = {a} is $h_{A}(x)=x \cdot a$.

The support function of the Euclidean unit ball $B = \{ y\in \mathbb{R}^n\,:\, \|y\|_2 \le 1\}$ is $h_{B}(x)=\|x\|_2$ where $\|\cdot\|_2$ is the 2-norm.

If A is a line segment through the origin with endpoints −a and a, then $h_A(x)=|x\cdot a|$.

== Properties ==
=== As a function of x ===
The support function of a compact nonempty convex set is real valued and continuous, but if the set is closed and unbounded, its support function is extended real valued (it takes the value $\infty$). As any nonempty closed convex set is the intersection of its supporting half spaces, the function h_{A} determines A uniquely. This can be used to describe certain geometric properties of convex sets analytically. For instance, a set A is point symmetric with respect to the origin if and only if h_{A} is an even function.

In general, the support function is not differentiable. However, directional derivatives exist and yield support functions of support sets. If A is compact and convex, and h_{A}'(u;x) denotes the directional derivative of h_{A} at u ≠ 0 in direction x, we have

$$h_A'(u;x)= h_{A \cap H(u)}(x) \qquad x \in \mathbb{R}^n.$$

Here H(u) is the supporting hyperplane of A with exterior normal vector u, defined above. If A ∩ H(u) is a singleton {y}, say, it follows that the support function is differentiable at u and its gradient coincides with y. Conversely, if h_{A} is differentiable at u, then A ∩ H(u) is a singleton. Hence h_{A} is differentiable at all points u ≠ 0 if and only if A is strictly convex (the boundary of A does not contain any line segments).

More generally, when $A$ is convex and closed then for any $u\in \mathbb{R}^n\setminus\{0\}$,

$$\partial h_A(u) = H(u)\cap A\,,$$

where $\partial h_A(u)$ denotes the set of subgradients of $h_A$ at $u$.

It follows directly from its definition that the support function is positive homogeneous:

$$h_A(\alpha x)=\alpha h_A(x),  \qquad \alpha \ge 0, x\in \mathbb{R}^n,$$

and subadditive:

$$h_A(x+y)\le h_A(x)+ h_A(y),  \qquad x,y\in \mathbb{R}^n.$$

It follows that h_{A} is a convex function. It is crucial in convex geometry that these properties characterize support functions: Any positive homogeneous, convex, real valued function on $\mathbb{R}^n$ is the support function of a nonempty compact convex set. Several proofs are known, one is using the fact that the Legendre transform of a positive homogeneous, convex, real valued function is the (convex) indicator function of a compact convex set.

Many authors restrict the support function to the Euclidean unit sphere and consider it as a function on S^{n-1}. The homogeneity property shows that this restriction determines the support function on $\mathbb{R}^n$, as defined above.

=== As a function of A ===
The support functions of a dilated or translated set are closely related to the original set A:

$$h_{\alpha A}(x)=\alpha h_A(x),  \qquad \alpha \ge 0, x\in \mathbb{R}^n$$

and

$$h_{A+b}(x)=h_A(x)+x\cdot b,  \qquad x,b\in \mathbb{R}^n.$$

The latter generalises to

$$h_{A+B}(x)=h_A(x)+h_B(x),  \qquad x\in \mathbb{R}^n,$$

where A + B denotes the Minkowski sum:

$$A + B := \{\, a + b \in \mathbb{R}^{n} \mid a \in A,\ b \in B \,\}.$$

The Hausdorff distance d_{H}(A, B) of two nonempty compact convex sets A and B can be expressed in terms of support functions,

$$d_{\mathrm H}(A,B) =  \| h_A-h_B\|_\infty$$

where, on the right hand side, the uniform norm on the unit sphere is used.

The properties of the support function as a function of the set A are sometimes summarized in saying that $\tau$:A $\mapsto$ h _{A} maps the family of non-empty compact convex sets to the cone of all real-valued continuous functions on the sphere whose positive homogeneous extension is convex. Abusing terminology slightly, $\tau$ is sometimes called linear, as it respects Minkowski addition, although it is not defined on a linear space, but rather on an (abstract) convex cone of nonempty compact convex sets. The mapping $\tau$ is an isometry between this cone, endowed with the Hausdorff metric, and a subcone of the family of continuous functions on S^{n-1} with the uniform norm.

== Variants ==
In contrast to the above, support functions are sometimes defined on the boundary of A rather than on S^{n-1}, under the assumption that there exists a unique exterior unit normal at each boundary point. Convexity is not needed for the definition. For an oriented regular surface, M, with a unit normal vector, N, defined everywhere on its surface, the support function is then defined by

$${x}\mapsto{x}\cdot N({x})$$.

In other words, for any ${x}\in M$, this support function gives the signed distance of the unique hyperplane that touches M in x.

== See also ==
- Barrier cone
- Supporting functional
