= Girth (geometry) =

Perimeter of a 3D object's parallel projection in a given direction

In three-dimensional geometry, the girth of a geometric object, in a certain direction, is the perimeter of its parallel projection in that direction. For instance, the girth of a unit cube in a direction parallel to one of the three coordinate axes is four: it projects to a unit square, which has four as its perimeter.

== Surfaces of constant girth ==
The girth of a sphere in any direction equals the circumference of its equator, or of any of its great circles. More generally, if S is a surface of constant width w, then every projection of S is a curve of constant width, with the same width w. All curves of constant width have the same perimeter, the same value πw as the circumference of a circle with that width (this is Barbier's theorem). Therefore, every surface of constant width is also a surface of constant girth: its girth in all directions is the same number πw. Hermann Minkowski proved, conversely, that every convex surface of constant girth is also a surface of constant width.

== Projection versus cross-section ==
For a prism or cylinder, its projection in the direction parallel to its axis is the same as its cross section, so in these cases the girth also equals the perimeter of the cross section. In some application areas such as shipbuilding this alternative meaning, the perimeter of a cross section, is taken as the definition of girth.

== Application ==
Girth is sometimes used by postal services and delivery companies as a basis for pricing. For example, Canada Post requires that an item's length plus girth not exceed a maximum allowed value. For a rectangular box, the girth is 2 * (height + width), i.e. the perimeter of a projection or cross section perpendicular to its length.
