= Buffon's noodle =

Variation of Buffon's needle

In geometric probability, the problem of Buffon's noodle is a variation on the well-known problem of Buffon's needle, named after Georges-Louis Leclerc, Comte de Buffon who lived in the 18th century. This approach to the problem was published by Joseph-Émile Barbier in 1860.

This variation of the Buffon's needle problem can be stated as follows:

Suppose there exist infinitely many parallel horizontal lines, spaced a distance $D$ apart, and we were to randomly toss a wet noodle (i.e. an arbitrary plane curve) of length $\ell$ onto them. What is the expected number of times that the noodle will cross a line upon landing?

Remarkably, this expected number turns out to be independent of the noodle's shape, an observation that also allows an elegant proof of the formula for this expected number as a function of $D$ and $\ell$.

== Buffon's needle ==
Suppose there exist infinitely many equally spaced parallel, horizontal lines, and we were to randomly toss a needle whose length is less than or equal to the distance between adjacent lines. What is the probability that the needle will lie across a line upon landing?

To solve this problem, let $\ell$ be the length of the needle and $D$ be the distance between two adjacent lines. Then, let $\theta$ be the acute angle the needle makes with the horizontal, and let $x$ be the distance from the center of the needle to the nearest line.

The needle lies across the nearest line if and only if $x \le \tfrac{\ell \sin \theta}{2}$. We see this condition from the right triangle formed by the needle, the nearest line, and the line of length $x$ when the needle lies across the nearest line.

Now, we assume that the values of $x, \theta$ are randomly determined when they land, where $0 < x < \tfrac{D}{2}$, since $0 < \ell < D$, and $0 < \theta < \tfrac{\pi}{2}$. The sample space for $x, \theta$ is thus a rectangle of side lengths $\tfrac{D}{2}$ and $\tfrac{\pi}{2}$.

The probability of the event that the needle lies across the nearest line is the fraction of the sample space that intersects with $x \le \tfrac{\ell}{2} \sin \theta$. Since $0 < \ell < D$, the area of this intersection is given by

$$\text{Area (event)} = \int^{\pi/2}_0 \frac{\ell}{2} \sin \theta \, d \theta = -\frac{\ell}{2}  \cos \frac{\pi}{2} + \frac{\ell}{2} \cos 0 = \frac{\ell}{2}.$$

Now, the area of the sample space is

$$\text{Area (sample space)} = \frac{D}{2} \times \frac{\pi}{2} = \frac{D \pi}{4}.$$

Hence, the probability $P$ of the event is

$P = \frac{\text{Area (event)}}{\text{Area (sample space)}} = \frac{\ell}{2} \cdot \frac{4}{D \pi} = \frac{2\ell}{\pi D}.$

Since the needle cannot cross more than one line at a time (or at best can do so only with probability zero, if its length exactly equals the distance between the lines), $P$ is also the expected number of crossings the needle makes with a line. This is mostly irrelevant to the original Buffon's needle problem, but turns out to be essential to the generalization.

== Bending the needle ==
The formula $\tfrac{2\ell}{\pi D}$, interpreted as the expected number of line crossings, remains valid even if the needle is bent in any way (subject to the constraint that it must lie in a plane), making it a "noodle"—an arbitrary plane curve. With this reinterpretation, we can also drop the assumption that the length of the noodle is no more than the distance between the parallel lines.

The shape of the noodle affects the probability distribution of the number of crossings, but not the expected number of crossings, which only depends only on the length $\ell$ of the noodle and the distance $D$ between the parallel lines. (Observe that a curved noodle may cross a single line multiple times.)

This fact may be proved as follows (see Klain and Rota). First suppose the noodle is piecewise linear, i.e. consists of $n$ straight pieces. Let $X_i$ be the number of times the $i$-th piece crosses one of the parallel lines. These random variables are not independent, but the expectations are still additive due to the linearity of expectation:

$$E(X_1 + \cdots + X_n) = E(X_1) + \cdots + E(X_n).$$

Regarding a curved noodle as the limit of a sequence of piecewise linear noodles, we conclude that the expected number of crossings per toss is proportional to the length; it is some constant times the length $\ell$.

Then the problem is to find the constant. For this, we may consider the case where the noodle is a perfect circle with diameter equal to the distance $D$ between the parallel lines, thus having a circumference of $\ell = \pi D$. In this case the number of crossings is always exactly 2: either the circle crosses a single line twice and touches no other lines, or (with probability zero) it just barely touches two adjacent lines at a single point each.

Since the expected number of crossings is independent of the shape of the noodle, it must thus be 2 for all noodles with length $\ell = \pi D$, and thus the constant of proportionality must be $\tfrac{2}{\pi D}$.

=== Barbier's theorem ===
Extending this argument slightly, if $C$ is a convex compact subset of $\R^2$, then the expected number of lines intersecting $C$ is equal to half the expected number of lines intersecting the perimeter of $C$, which is $\tfrac{|\partial C|}{\pi D}$.

In particular, if the noodle is any closed curve of constant width D, then the number of crossings is also exactly 2. This means the perimeter has length $\pi D$, the same as that of a circle, proving Barbier's theorem.

== See also ==
- Crofton formula
