= Joseph-Émile Barbier =

French astronomer and mathematician (1839–1889)

- Born: 18 March 1839; Saint-Hilaire-Cottes, France
- Died: 28 January 1889 (aged 49); Saint-Genest-Lerpt, France
- Known for: Barbier's theorem
- Scientific career
- Fields: Mathematics

Joseph-Émile Barbier (1839–1889) was a French astronomer and mathematician, known for Barbier's theorem on the perimeter of curves of constant width.

Barbier was born on 18 March 1839 in Saint-Hilaire-Cottes, Pas-de-Calais, in the north of France. He studied at the College of Saint-Omer, also in Pas-de-Calais, and then at the Lycée Henri-IV in Paris. He entered the École Normale Supérieure in 1857, and finished his studies there in 1860, the same year in which he published the paper containing his theorem on constant-width curves. In this paper he also presented a solution to Buffon's needle problem, known as Buffon's noodle, that avoided the use of integrals.

He began teaching at a lycée in Nice, but it was not a success, and he soon moved to a position as an assistant astronomer at the Paris Observatory. He left there in 1865, and in 1880 Joseph Louis François Bertrand found him in the Charenton asylum. Bertrand arranged for Barbier's support and encouraged him to return to mathematical publication.

In this later period of his work, he published ten more papers. He contributed to Bertrand's studies of combinatorics, and announced a generalization of Bertrand's ballot theorem. He was given the Francoeur Prize for his mathematical research by the French Academy of Sciences in multiple years.

Barbier died on 28 January 1889 in Saint-Genest, Loire.
