= Morgan Crofton =

Irish mathematician

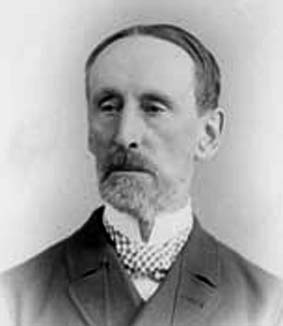
Morgan Crofton

Morgan William Crofton (1826, Dublin, Ireland – 1915, Brighton, England) was an Irish mathematician who contributed to the field of geometric probability theory. He also worked with James Joseph Sylvester and contributed an article on probability to the 9th edition of the Encyclopædia Britannica. Crofton's formula is named in his honour.

== Early life ==
Morgan Crofton was born into a wealthy Anglo-Irish family. His father, the Reverend William Crofton, Rector of Skreen, County Sligo, was the younger brother of Sir Malby Crofton, 2nd Baronet of Longford House. He was also the cousin of Lord Edward Crofton, Baron Crofton of the Mote. Despite being born into an aristocratic, Anglican family, Crofton joined to the Roman Catholic Church in the 1850s in part due to an interest in Cardinal John Henry Newman. This led to his resignation at Queen's College, Galway and transference to various Catholic colleges.

He married twice: firstly on 31 August 1857 Julia Agnes Cecilia, daughter of J B Kernan (died 1902) and secondly Katherine, daughter of Holland Taylor of Manchester.

== Career ==
He was Professor of Mathematics at the Royal Military Academy, Woolwich and Professor of Natural Philosophy at Queen's University of Ireland. He was elected a Fellow of the Royal Society in June, 1868.
