= Crofton formula =

Result in integral geometry

In mathematics, the Crofton formula, named after Morgan Crofton (1826–1915), (also Cauchy-Crofton formula) is a classic result of integral geometry relating the length of a curve to the expected number of times a "random" line intersects it.

== Statement ==
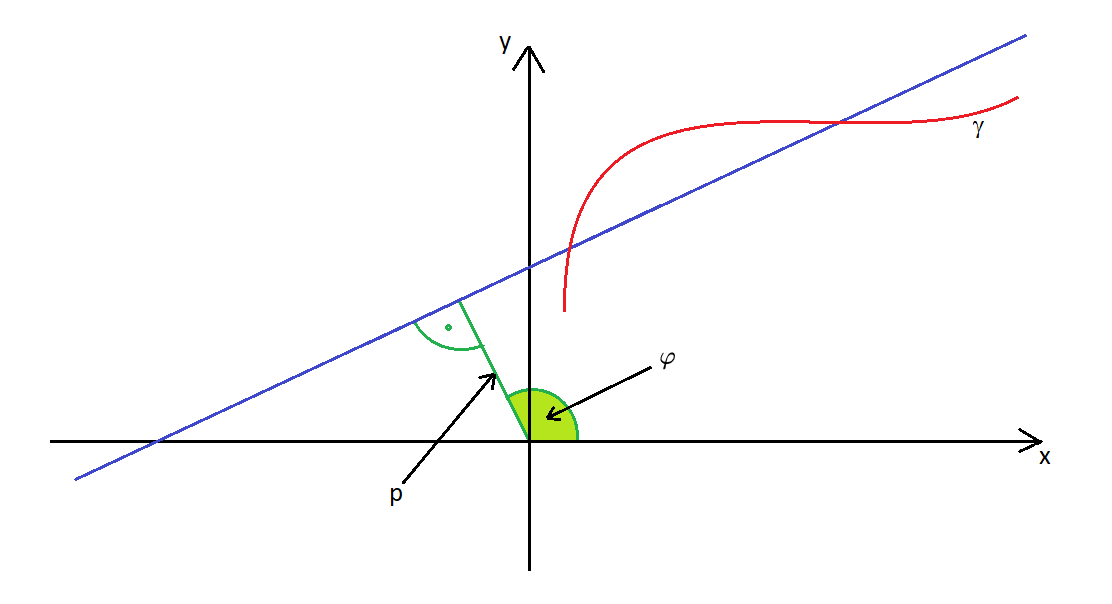
The line defined by choices of $\varphi,p$ intersects the curve $\gamma$ twice, therefore, $n_\gamma(\varphi, p)=2$.

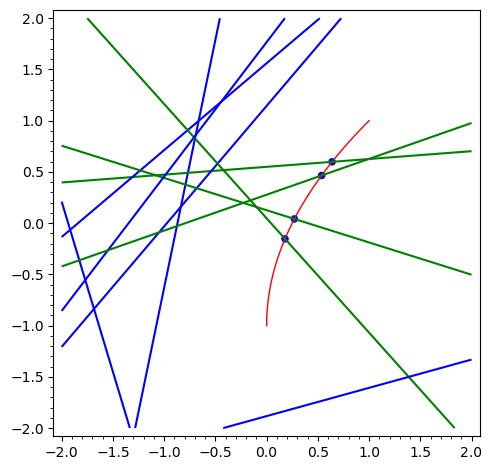
Application of the Crofton formula in a Monte-Carlo simulation.

Suppose $\gamma$ is a rectifiable plane curve. Given an oriented line ℓ, let $n_\gamma$(ℓ) be the number of points at which $\gamma$ and ℓ intersect. We can parametrize the general line ℓ by the direction $\varphi$ in which it points and its signed distance $p$ from the origin. The Crofton formula expresses the arc length of the curve $\gamma$ in terms of an integral over the space of all oriented lines:

$$\operatorname{length} (\gamma) = \frac14\iint n_\gamma(\varphi, p)\; d\varphi\; dp.$$

The differential form

$$d\varphi\wedge dp$$

is invariant under rigid motions of $\R^2$, so it is a natural integration measure for speaking of an "average" number of intersections. It is usually called the kinematic measure.

The right-hand side in the Crofton formula is sometimes called the Favard length.

In general, the space of oriented lines in $\R^n$ is the tangent bundle of $S^{n-1}$, and we can similarly define a kinematic measure $d\varphi\wedge dp$ on it, which is also invariant under rigid motions of $\R^n$. Then for any rectifiable surface $S$ of codimension 1, we have
$$\operatorname{area} (S) = C_n \iint n_\gamma(\varphi, p)\; d\varphi\; dp.$$
where
$$C_n = \frac{1}{2 \cdot |\text{unit ball in }\R^{n-1}|} = \frac{\Gamma{(\frac{n+1}{2})}}{2\pi^{\frac{n-1}{2}}}$$

== Proof sketch ==
Both sides of the Crofton formula are additive over concatenation of curves, so it suffices to prove the formula for a single line segment. Since the right-hand side does not depend on the positioning of the line segment, it must equal some function of the segment's length. Because, again, the formula is additive over concatenation of line segments, the integral must be a constant times the length of the line segment. It remains only to determine the factor of 1/4; this is easily done by computing both sides when γ is the unit circle.

The proof for the generalized version proceeds exactly as above.

== Poincaré’s formula for intersecting curves ==
Let $E^2$ be the Euclidean group on the plane. It can be parametrized as $[0, 2\pi) \times \R^2$, such that each $(\varphi, x, y)\in [0, 2\pi) \times \R^2$ defines some $T(\varphi, x, y)$: rotate by $\varphi$ counterclockwise around the origin, then translate by $(x, y)$. Then $dx\wedge dy \wedge d\varphi$ is invariant under action of $E^2$ on itself, thus we obtained a kinematic measure on $E^2$.

Given rectifiable simple (no self-intersection) curves $C, D$ in the plane, then
$$\int_{T\in E^2} |C\cap T(D)| dT = 4|C|\cdot |D|$$
The proof is done similarly as above. First note that both sides of the formula are additive in $C, D$, thus the formula is correct with an undetermined multiplicative constant. Then explicitly calculate this constant, using the simplest possible case: two circles of radius 1.

== Other forms ==
The space of oriented lines is a double cover of the space of unoriented lines. The Crofton formula is often stated in terms of the corresponding density in the latter space, in which the numerical factor is not 1/4 but 1/2. Since a convex curve intersects almost every line either twice or not at all, the unoriented Crofton formula for convex curves can be stated without numerical factors: the measure of the set of straight lines which intersect a convex curve is equal to its length.

The same formula (with the same multiplicative constants) apply for hyperbolic spaces and spherical spaces, when the kinematic measure is suitably scaled. The proof is essentially the same.

The Crofton formula generalizes to any Riemannian surface or more generally to two-dimensional Finsler manifolds; the integral is then performed with the natural measure on the space of geodesics.

More general forms exist, such as the kinematic formula of Chern.

== Applications ==
Crofton's formula yields elegant proofs of the following results, among others:

- Given two nested, convex, closed curves, the inner one is shorter. In general, for two such codimension 1 surfaces, the inner one has less area.
- Given two nested, convex, closed surfaces $S_1, S_2$, with $S_1$ nested inside $S_2$, the probability of a random line $l$ intersecting the inner surface $S_1$, conditional on it intersecting the outer surface $S_2$, is
  $$Pr(l \text{ intersects } S_1|l \text{ intersects } S_2) = \frac{\operatorname{area}(S_1)}{\operatorname{area}(S_2)}$$
  This is the justification for the surface area heuristic in bounding volume hierarchy.
- Given compact convex subset $S\subset\R^n$, let $l$ be a random line, and $P$ be a random hyperplane, then
  $$Pr(l\text{ intersects } P| l, P\text{ intersects } S) = \frac{|S|}{|\partial S| \cdot E[\text{width of }S]}$$
  where $E[\text{width of }S]$ is the average width of $S$, that is, the expected length of the orthogonal projection of $S$ to a random linear subspace of $\R^n$. When $n=2$, by the isoperimetric inequality, this probability is upper bounded by $\frac 1 2$, with equality iff $S$ is a disk.
- Barbier's theorem: Every curve of constant width w has perimeter πw.
- The isoperimetric inequality: Among all closed curves with a given perimeter, the circle has the unique maximum area.
- The convex hull of every bounded rectifiable closed curve C has perimeter at most the length of C, with equality only when C is already a convex curve.
- Cauchy's surface area formula: Given any convex compact subset $S\subset \R^n$, let $E[|T(S)|]$ be the expected shadow area of $S$ (that is, $T$ is the orthogonal projection to a random hyperplane of $\R^n$), then by integrating Crofton formula first over $dp$, then over $d\varphi$, we get
  $$\frac{|\partial S|}{E[|T(S)|]}
= \frac{|\text{unit sphere in }\R^{n}|}{|\text{unit ball in }\R^{n-1}|}
= 2\sqrt\pi\frac{\Gamma(\frac{n+1}{2})}{\Gamma(\frac{n}{2})}$$
  In particular, setting $n=2$ gives Barbier's theorem, $n=3$ gives the classic example "the average shadow of a convex body is 1/4 of its surface area". General $n$ gives generalization of Barbier's theorem for bodies of constant brightness.

== See also ==
- Buffon's noodle
- The Radon transform can be viewed as a measure-theoretic generalization of the Crofton formula and the Crofton formula is used in the inversion formula of the k-plane Radon transform of Gel'fand and Graev
- Steinhaus longimeter
