= Harry J. Khamis =

Biostatistician, academic, and author

- Occupations: Biostatistician, academic, consultant, and author

Academic background
- Education: BS., Mathematics; MS., Mathematics; PhD., Statistics
- Alma mater: Santa Clara University; Virginia Polytechnic Institute & State University
- Thesis: Log-linear Model Analysis of the Association Between Disease and Genotype

Harry J. Khamis is a biostatistician, academic, consultant and author. He is the emeritus director of the Statistical Consulting Center and an emeritus professor in the Department of Mathematics and Statistics and the Department of Community Health at the Boonshoft School of Medicine at Wright State University.

Khamis is most known for his research in statistical methodology, with a particular focus on categorical response models, goodness of fit tests, geometric probability, and the Cox regression model. He has co-authored a book titled Applied Calculus for Students in the Biosciences and is the author of The Association Graph and the Multigraph for Loglinear Models.

Khamis is a Fellow of the American Statistical Association.

== Education ==
Khamis obtained his Bachelor of Science in mathematics from Santa Clara University in 1974, his Master of Science in mathematics in 1976, and his Doctor of Philosophy in Statistics in 1980, both from Virginia Polytechnic Institute & State University.

== Career ==
Khamis began his career in 1980 as an assistant professor at the Department of Mathematics and Statistics at Wright State University. In 1986, he was appointed as an associate professor there and concurrently served as an associate professor in the Department of Community Health from 1990 to 1993. From 1994 to 2015, he held a joint appointment as a professor in the Department of Mathematics and Statistics and the Department of Community Health at the Boonshoft School of Medicine. Since his retirement in 2015, he has been serving as emeritus professor at the Department of Mathematics and Statistics and the Department of Community Health in the Boonshoft School of Medicine at Wright State University.

Khamis was the associate director of the Statistical Consulting Center from 1989 to 1993 and was appointed as the director from 1993 to 2015 at Wright State University. Since 2015, he has been holding an appointment as the emeritus director of the Statistical Consulting Center within the same institution.

== Research ==
Khamis has authored or co-authored over 100 peer-reviewed publications spanning the areas of health and medical statistics and statistical methodology, including categorical response models, goodness of fit tests, survival analysis, and geometric probability. In addition, he has given over 120 technical talks/seminars all over the U.S. and in 10 other countries.

=== Khamis-Roche stature prediction model ===
Collaborating with A.F. Roche, Khamis developed the Khamis-Roche Stature Prediction Model used in predicting adult stature in white American children without using skeletal age. It was found that the method can predict adult stature with only a slight decrease in accuracy and reliability compared to methods using skeletal age. Relatedly, his research validated the variations of the RWT prediction model to estimate adult stature in Caucasian Americans, recommending the multivariate cubic spline smoothing [MCS^{2}(1)] method for improved accuracy and reliability.

=== Collaborative medical research ===
In collaborative research on BMI and obesity screening in 1996, it was discovered that BMI is an uncertain indicator of obesity, and specific cut-off values of 25 kg/m^{2} for men and 23 kg/m^{2} for women were recommended to enhance obesity screening accuracy by considering body composition. As another example, in collaboration with ophthalmologist John Bullock et al. in 2011, the cause of the Fusarium Keratitis epidemic of 2004-6 was discovered; it was also determined that the epidemic could have been declared several months sooner than the actual declaration.

=== Two-stage delta-corrected kolmogorov-smirnov test ===
Khamis' research has contributed to the increased statistical power of the classic Kolmogorov-Smirnov test by introducing a delta in the empirical distribution function. The new test maintained test size and increased power by up to ten percentage points. He then determined that the two-stage delta-corrected test was uniformly more powerful than the classical test.

=== Multigraph representation of hierarchical loglinear models ===
In collaboration with graph theorist Terry McKee, Khamis developed a methodology for analyzing and interpreting loglinear models using the generator multigraph. This led to a more facile way of analyzing and interpreting loglinear models. In particular, it enables faster and easier ways of identifying decomposable loglinear models, identifying independencies and conditional independencies, and factoring the joint probability in decomposable loglinear models.

=== Geometric probability ===
Khamis solved a number of variations of the historically classical Buffon's Needle Problem (1733). One unsolved problem was: what is the probability that a needle randomly tossed onto a set of concentric circles will cross a circumference? This problem was solved by him in 1987.

== Awards and honors ==
- 2011 – Professional Statistician (“PStat”), American Statistical Association
- 2014 – Elected Fellow, American Statistical Association

== Bibliography ==
=== Books ===
- Association Graph and the Multigraph for Loglinear Models (2011) ISBN 9781412972383
- Applied Calculus for Students in the Biosciences, Linus Learning

=== Selected articles ===
- Khamiss, H. J. (1983). Log-linear model analysis of the semi-symmetric intraclass contingency table. Communications in Statistics-Theory and Methods, 12(23), 2723–2752.
- Khamis, H. J. (1987). On Buffon's Needle Problem Using Concentric Circles. Pi Mu Epsilon Journal, 8(6), 368–376.
- Khamis, H. J. (1988). Contingency table estimation of genetic parameters and disease risks. Statistics in Medicine, 7(5), 591–600.
- Khamis, H. J., & Roche, A. F. (1994). Predicting adult stature without using skeletal age: the Khamis-Roche method. Pediatrics, 94(4), 504–507. Erratum: Pediatrics 95(3), 457.
- Khamis, H. J. (2000). The two-stage delta-corrected Kolmogorov-Smirnov test. Journal of Applied Statistics, 27(4), 439–450.
- Khamis, H. J. (2005). Multigraph modeling. Wiley StatsRef: Statistics Reference Online.
- Khamis, H. J., & Kepler, M. (2010). Sample size in multiple regression: 20+ 5k. Journal of Applied Statistical Science, 17(4), 505.
- Khamis, H. J. (2011). The association graph and the multigraph for loglinear models (Vol. 167). Sage Publications.
