= Triangle inequality =

Property of geometry, also used to generalize the notion of "distance" in metric spaces

Three examples of the triangle inequality for triangles with sides of lengths x, y, z. The top example shows a case where z is much less than the sum x + y of the other two sides, and the bottom example shows a case where the side z is only slightly less than x + y.

In mathematics, the triangle inequality states that for any triangle in Euclidean space, the sum of the lengths of any two sides must be greater than or equal to the length of the third side. If a, b, and c are the lengths of the sides of a triangle then:
$$c \leq a + b.$$
The same inequality holds when the sides of the triangle are relabeled, so also $b \leq a + c$ and $a \leq b + c$. When one side length is equal to the sum of the other two, $c = a + b$, the triangle is degenerate, with zero area.

The triangle inequality implies a related statement for Euclidean vectors, also called the triangle inequality; if u and v are vectors (directed magnitudes, usually drawn as arrows), then u, v, and their sum u + v can be pictured as sides that are assembled into a triangle, with each vector's norm as the length of the corresponding side. Therefore
$$\|\mathbf u + \mathbf v\| \leq \|\mathbf u\| + \|\mathbf v\|.$$

The triangle inequality also holds in some contexts other than Euclidean space. For example, it holds for triangles on a sphere and in the hyperbolic plane. But it does not hold in some contexts, for example Minkowski spacetime.

The triangle inequality is one of the defining properties of a distance function in a metric space; if X, Y, and Z are any three points, only a function d which satisfies the triangle inequality,
$$d(X, Z) \leq d(X, Y) + d(Y, Z),$$
is considered to be a proper notion of distance. The analog of the triangle inequality for vectors is also a defining property of the norm in normed vector spaces.

== Euclidean geometry ==
Euclid's construction for proof of the triangle inequality for plane geometry.

The triangle inequality theorem appears in Euclid's Elements as Proposition 20 of Book I:

In any triangle the sum of any two sides is greater than the remaining one.

Euclid proved it using the construction shown in the figure. Beginning with triangle ABC, the side A̅B̅ is extended by the same length as B̅C̅ to a new point D, forming an isosceles triangle CBD, which has two equal angles BDC and BCD, labeled $\alpha$. Angle ACD, labeled $\beta$, contains angle BCD, so $\beta > \alpha$. Therefore side A̅D̅ must be longer than side A̅C̅ (by Proposition I.19, that an inequality between two angles of a triangle implies a corresponding inequality between their respective opposite sides). However:
$$\overline{AD} = \overline{AB} + \overline{BD} = \overline{AB} + \overline{BC},$$
so the sum of the lengths of sides A̅B̅ and B̅C̅ is larger than the length of A̅C̅.

=== Mathematical expression of the constraint on the sides of a triangle ===
For a non-degenerate triangle with side lengths a, b, c, the triangle inequality states that
$$a + b > c,\quad b + c > a,\quad c + a > b.$$
This set of three inequalities can be succinctly summarized as
$$|a - b| < c < a + b .$$
Or, equivalently, as
$$\max(a, b, c) < \tfrac12(a + b + c)$$
where max(a, b, c) is the length of the longest side. That is, the longest side of a triangle is always shorter than the semiperimeter, $s = \tfrac12(a+b+c)$.

Another equivalent statement is that the area of a triangle with sides a, b, c and semiperimeter s must be a real number greater than zero. Heron's formula for the area is
$$\begin{align}
\text{area} & = \sqrt{s(s-a)(s-b)(s-c)}  \\[3pt]
4\cdot \text{area} & =  \sqrt{(a+b+c)(-a+b+c)(a-b+c)(a+b-c)} \,.
\end{align}$$
In terms of either area expression, the triangle inequality imposed on all sides is equivalent to the condition that the expression under the square root sign be real and greater than zero (so that the area expression is real and greater than zero).

The triangle inequality provides upper bounds for ratios of side lengths; with sides labeled in ascending length order 0 < a ≤ b ≤ c:
$$\begin{align}
1&<\frac{c+a}{b}<3, \\
1&\le\min\left(\frac{c}{b}, \frac{b}{a}\right)<\varphi,
\end{align}$$
where $\varphi = \tfrac12\bigl(1 + \sqrt5\bigr)$ is the golden ratio.

=== Right triangle ===
Isosceles triangle with equal sides A̅B̅ = A̅C̅ divided into two right triangles by an altitude drawn from one of the two base angles.

In the case of right triangles, the triangle inequality specializes to the statement that the hypotenuse is greater than either of the two sides and less than their sum.

The second part of this theorem is already established above for any side of any triangle. The first part is established using the lower figure. In the figure, consider the right triangle ADC. An isosceles triangle ABC is constructed with equal sides A̅B̅ = A̅C̅. From the triangle postulate, the angles in the right triangle ADC satisfy:
$$\alpha + \gamma = \pi /2 \ .$$
Likewise, in the isosceles triangle ABC, the angles satisfy:
$$2\beta + \gamma = \pi \ .$$
Therefore,
$$\alpha = \pi/2 - \gamma ,\ \mathrm{while} \ \beta= \pi/2 - \gamma /2  \ ,$$
and so, in particular,
$$\alpha < \beta \ .$$
That means side AD, which is opposite to angle α, is shorter than side AB, which is opposite to the larger angle β. But A̅B̅ = A̅C̅. Hence:
$$\overline{AC} > \overline{AD} \ .$$
A similar construction shows A̅C̅ > D̅C̅, establishing the theorem.

An alternative proof (also based upon the triangle postulate) proceeds by considering three positions for point B: (i) as depicted (which is to be proved), or (ii) B coincident with D (which would mean the isosceles triangle had two right angles as base angles plus the vertex angle γ, which would violate the triangle postulate), or lastly, (iii) B interior to the right triangle between points A and D (in which case angle ABC is an exterior angle of a right triangle BDC and therefore larger than π/2, meaning the other base angle of the isosceles triangle also is greater than π/2 and their sum exceeds π in violation of the triangle postulate).

This theorem establishing inequalities is sharpened by Pythagoras' theorem to the equality that the square of the length of the hypotenuse equals the sum of the squares of the other two sides.

=== Generalization to any polygon ===
The triangle inequality can be extended by mathematical induction to arbitrary polygonal paths. This gives the generalized polygon inequality, which asserts that the total length of such a path is no less than the length of the straight line between its endpoints. Consequently, the length of any polygon side is always less than the sum of the other polygon side lengths.

==== Relationship with shortest paths ====
The arc length of a curve is defined as the least upper bound of the lengths of polygonal approximations.

This generalization can be used to prove that the shortest curve between two points in Euclidean geometry is a straight line.

No polygonal path between two points is shorter than the line between them. This implies that no curve can have an arc length less than the distance between its endpoints. By definition, the arc length of a curve is the least upper bound of the lengths of all polygonal approximations of the curve. The result for polygonal paths shows that the straight line between the endpoints is the shortest of all the polygonal approximations. Because the arc length of the curve is greater than or equal to the length of every polygonal approximation, the curve itself cannot be shorter than the straight line path.

=== Converse ===
The converse of the triangle inequality theorem is also true: if three real numbers are such that each is less than the sum of the others, then there exists a triangle with these numbers as its side lengths and with positive area; and if one number equals the sum of the other two, there exists a degenerate triangle (that is, with zero area) with these numbers as its side lengths.

In either case, if the side lengths are a, b, c we can attempt to place a triangle in the Euclidean plane as shown in the diagram. We need to prove that there exists a real number h consistent with the values a, b, and c, in which case this triangle exists.

Triangle with altitude h cutting base c into d + (c − d).

By the Pythagorean theorem we have b^{2} = h^{2} + d^{2} and a^{2} = h^{2} + (c − d)^{2} according to the figure at the right. Subtracting these yields a^{2} − b^{2} = c^{2} − 2cd. This equation allows us to express d in terms of the sides of the triangle:
$$d=\frac{-a^2+b^2+c^2}{2c}.$$
For the height of the triangle we have that h^{2} = b^{2} − d^{2}. By replacing d with the formula given above, we have

$$h^2 = b^2-\left(\frac{-a^2+b^2+c^2}{2c}\right)^2.$$

For a real number h to satisfy this, h^{2} must be non-negative:
$$\begin{align}
0 &\le b^2-\left(\frac{-a^2+b^2+c^2}{2c}\right)^2 \\[4pt]
0 &\le \left(b- \frac{-a^2+b^2+c^2}{2c}\right) \left(b + \frac{-a^2+b^2+c^2}{2c}\right) \\[4pt]
0 &\le \left(a^2-(b-c)^2)((b+c)^2-a^2 \right) \\[6pt]
0 &\le (a+b-c)(a-b+c)(b+c+a)(b+c-a) \\[6pt]
0 &\le (a+b-c)(a+c-b)(b+c-a)
\end{align}$$
which holds if the triangle inequality is satisfied for all sides. Therefore, there does exist a real number $h$ consistent with the sides $a, b, c$, and the triangle exists. If each triangle inequality holds strictly, $h > 0$ and the triangle is non-degenerate (has positive area); but if one of the inequalities holds with equality, so $h = 0$, the triangle is degenerate.

=== Generalization to higher dimensions ===
The area of a triangular face of a tetrahedron is less than or equal to the sum of the areas of the other three triangular faces. More generally, in Euclidean space the hypervolume of an (n − 1)-facet of an n-simplex is less than or equal to the sum of the hypervolumes of the other n facets.

Much as the triangle inequality generalizes to a polygon inequality, the inequality for a simplex of any dimension generalizes to a polytope of any dimension: the hypervolume of any facet of a polytope is less than or equal to the sum of the hypervolumes of the remaining facets.

In some cases the tetrahedral inequality is stronger than several applications of the triangle inequality. For example, the triangle inequality appears to allow the possibility of four points A, B, C, and Z in Euclidean space such that distances

AB = BC = CA = 26

and

AZ = BZ = CZ = 14.

However, points with such distances cannot exist: the area of the 26–26–26 equilateral triangle ABC is $169\sqrt 3$, which is larger than three times $39\sqrt 3$, the area of a 26–14–14 isosceles triangle (all by Heron's formula), and so the arrangement is forbidden by the tetrahedral inequality.

== Spherical geometry ==
In spherical geometry, a triangle is formed from three points and three great circle arcs, each connecting a pair of the points. There are two great circle arcs that connect a pair of points; except when the vertices are exactly opposite on the sphere, one of those arcs will be the short way around the sphere and the other will be the long way around the sphere. In this geometry, the triangle inequality tells us that the smaller length of the two arcs connecting a pair of points will have length less than or equal to the sum of the lengths of the arcs connecting the other pairs of points. That is, the triangle inequality gives c ≤ a + b whenever c is not more than 180° (π radians). This can be written as sin(c/2) ≤ sin(a/2) + sin(b/2), without having to check whether c exceeds 180°.

=== Triangle inequality for cosine similarity ===
By applying the cosine function to the triangle inequality and reverse triangle inequality for arc lengths and employing the angle addition and subtraction formulas for cosines, it follows immediately that

$$\cos(u,w) \geq \cos(u,v) \cdot \cos(v,w) - \sqrt{\left(1-\cos(u,v)^2\right)\cdot\left(1-\cos(v,w)^2\right)}$$

and

$$\cos(u,w) \leq \cos(u,v) \cdot \cos(v,w) + \sqrt{\left(1-\cos(u,v)^2\right)\cdot\left(1-\cos(v,w)^2\right)}\,.$$

With these formulas, one needs to compute a square root for each triple of vectors {u, v, w} that is examined rather than arccos(cos(u,v)) for each pair of vectors {u, v} examined, and could be a performance improvement when the number of triples examined is less than the number of pairs examined.

== Normed vector space ==
Triangle inequality for norms of vectors.

In a normed vector space V, one of the defining properties of the norm is the triangle inequality:

$$\|\mathbf u + \mathbf v\| \leq \|\mathbf u\| + \|\mathbf v\| \quad \forall \, \mathbf u, \mathbf v \in V$$

That is, the norm of the sum of two vectors is at most as large as the sum of the norms of the two vectors. This is also referred to as subadditivity. For any proposed function to behave as a norm, it must satisfy this requirement.

=== Triangle equality ===
If the normed space is Euclidean, or, more generally, strictly convex, then the triangle equality
$$\|\mathbf u + \mathbf v\| = \|\mathbf u\| + \|\mathbf v\|$$
holds if and only if the triangle formed by u, v, and u + v is degenerate; that is, u and v are on the same ray, i.e., u = 0 or v = 0 or u = α v for some α > 0.

This property characterizes strictly convex normed spaces such as the ℓ_{p} spaces with 1 < p < ∞. However, there are normed spaces in which this is not true. For instance, consider the plane with the ℓ_{1} norm (the Manhattan distance) and denote u = (1, 0) and v = (0, 1). Then the triangle formed by u, v, and u + v, is non-degenerate but

$$\|\mathbf u+\mathbf v\|=\|(1,1)\|=|1|+|1|=2=\|\mathbf u\|+\|\mathbf v\|.$$

=== Example norms ===
The absolute value is a norm for the real line; as required, the absolute value satisfies the triangle inequality for any real numbers u and v.

- If u and v have the same sign or either of them is zero, then
  $$|u + v| = |u|+|v|.$$
- If u and v have opposite signs, then without loss of generality assume $|u| \ge |v|.$ Then
  $$|u + v| = |u| - |v| < |u| + |v|.$$

Combining these cases:

$$|u + v| \leq |u|+|v|.$$

The triangle inequality is useful in mathematical analysis for determining the best upper estimate on the size of the sum of two numbers, in terms of the sizes of the individual numbers. There is also a lower estimate, which can be found using the reverse triangle inequality which states that for any real numbers u and v,
$$|u-v| \geq \bigl||u|-|v|\bigr|.$$
The modulus of a complex number is a generalization of the absolute value to the complex plane and is a norm for the complex numbers, regarded as a one-dimensional complex vector space or as a two-dimensional real vector space. For a complex number $z=x+iy,\ (x,y\in\mathbb{R}),$ it is defined by $|z|=\sqrt{x^2+y^2}.$ For a complex number expressed in polar form, $z=re^{i\theta},$ with $r\geq 0$ and $\theta\in[0,2\pi),$ it is given by $|z|=r.$ For complex numbers $u,v\in\mathbb{C},$ the triangle inequality holds and is equivalent, by representing complex numbers geometrically using an Argand diagram, to the triangle inequality for vectors in the Euclidean plane.

To prove this algebraically, first observe that for any complex numbers $u$ and $v,$ there exists $c\in\mathbb{C}$ such that $|c|=1$ and $c(u+v)=|u+v|.$ (If $u+v=re^{i\theta}$ is nonzero, let $c=e^{-i\theta}.$ If $u+v=0,$ simply let $c=1.$) From this, the following computation gives the triangle inequality:

$$|u+v|=c(u+v)= \mathrm{Re}(cu)+\mathrm{Re}(cv) \leq |cu|+|cv|=|u|+|v|.$$

The second equality in the chain follows from the fact that $c(u+v)$ is real and equal to its real part, while the inequality in the chain follows from the fact that for any complex number $z=x+iy$ written in rectangular form, $\mathrm{Re}(z)=x\leq\sqrt{x^2+y^2}=|z|$ must hold. Setting aside the trivial situation where $u+v=0$ holds, this proof can be visualized by representing complex numbers as Euclidean vectors in the Argand plane: the first equality in the chain corresponds to adding two vectors head-to-tail and rotating their vector sum to coincide with the positive real axis. The rest of the computation can be visualized by considering the lengths of the rotated summand vectors and their projections onto the real axis.

The taxicab norm or 1-norm is one generalization absolute value to higher dimensions. To find the norm of a vector $v = (v_1, v_2, \ldots v_n ),$ just add the absolute value of each component separately,
$$\|v\|_1 = |v_1| + |v_2| + \dotsb + |v_n|.$$

The Euclidean norm or 2-norm defines the length of translation vectors in an n-dimensional Euclidean space in terms of a Cartesian coordinate system. For a vector $v = (v_1, v_2, \ldots v_n ),$ its length is defined using the n-dimensional Pythagorean theorem:
$$\|v\|_2 = \sqrt{|v_1|^2 + |v_2|^2 + \dotsb + |v_n|^2}.$$

The inner product is norm in any inner product space, a generalization of Euclidean vector spaces including infinite-dimensional examples. The triangle inequality follows from the Cauchy–Schwarz inequality as follows: Given vectors u and v, and denoting the inner product as $\langle u , v\rangle$:

$$\begin{align}
\|u + v\|^2 &= \langle u + v, u + v \rangle \\
&= \|u\|^2 + \langle u, v \rangle + \langle v, u \rangle + \|v\|^2 \\
&\le \|u\|^2 + 2|\langle u, v \rangle| + \|v\|^2 \\
&\le \|u\|^2 + 2\|u\|\|v\| + \|v\|^2 \quad \text{(by Cauchy–Schwarz inequality)} \\
&=  \left(\|u\| + \|v\|\right)^2
\end{align}$$

The Cauchy–Schwarz inequality turns into an equality if and only if u and v are linearly dependent. The inequality $\langle u, v \rangle + \langle v, u \rangle \le 2\left|\left\langle u, v \right\rangle\right|$ turns into an equality for linearly dependent u and v if and only if one of the vectors u or v is a nonnegative scalar of the other. Taking the square root of the final result gives the triangle inequality.

The p-norm is a generalization of taxicab and Euclidean norms, using an arbitrary positive integer exponent,
$$\|v\|_p = \bigl(|v_1|^p + |v_2|^p + \dotsb + |v_n|^p\bigr)^{1/p},$$
where the v_{i} are the components of vector v.

Except for the case p = 2, the p-norm is not an inner product norm, because it does not satisfy the parallelogram law. The triangle inequality for general values of p is called Minkowski's inequality. It takes the form:
$$\|u+v\|_p \le \|u\|_p + \|v\|_p \ .$$

== Metric space ==
In a metric space M with metric d, the triangle inequality is a requirement upon distance:
$$d(A,\ C) \le d(A,\ B) + d(B,\ C) \ ,$$

for all points A, B, and C in M. That is, the distance from A to C is at most as large as the sum of the distance from A to B and the distance from B to C.

The triangle inequality is responsible for most of the interesting structure on a metric space, namely, convergence. This is because the remaining requirements for a metric are rather simplistic in comparison. For example, the fact that any convergent sequence in a metric space is a Cauchy sequence is a direct consequence of the triangle inequality, because if we choose any x_{n} and x_{m} such that
$$d(x_n, x) < \frac{\varepsilon}{2}, \quad
d(x_m, x) < \frac{\varepsilon}{2},$$
where ε > 0 is given and arbitrary (as in the definition of a limit in a metric space), then by the triangle inequality,

$$d(x_n, x_m) \leq d(x_n, x) + d(x_m, x) < \frac{\varepsilon}{2} + \frac{\varepsilon}{2} = \varepsilon,$$

so that the sequence {x_{n}} is a Cauchy sequence, by definition.

This version of the triangle inequality reduces to the one stated above in case of normed vector spaces where a metric is induced via
$$d(u, v) := \| u-v \|,$$
with u − v being the vector pointing from point v to u.

== Reverse triangle inequality ==
The reverse triangle inequality is an equivalent alternative formulation of the triangle inequality that gives lower bounds instead of upper bounds. For plane geometry, the statement is:

Any side of a triangle is greater than or equal to the difference between the other two sides.

In the case of a normed vector space, the statement is:
$$\big|\|u\|-\|v\|\big| \leq \|u-v\|,$$
or, for metric spaces:
$$|d(A, C) - d(B, C)| \leq d(A, B).$$
This implies that the norm $\|\cdot\|$ as well as the distance-from-z function d(z, ·) are Lipschitz continuous with Lipschitz constant 1, and therefore are in particular uniformly continuous.

The proof of the reverse triangle inequality from the usual one uses
$$\begin{align}
\|v-u\| &= \|{-}1(u-v)\| \\[2pt]
&= |{-}1|\cdot\|u-v\| \\[2pt]
&= \|u-v\|
\end{align}$$
to find:
$$\begin{align}
\|u\| = \|(u-v) + v\| &\leq \|u-v\| + \|v\| \\[4pt]
\Rightarrow \quad \|u\| - \|v\| &\leq \|u-v\|, \\[10pt]
\|v\| = \|(v-u) + u\| &\leq \|v-u\| + \|u\| \\[4pt]
\Rightarrow \quad \|u\| - \|v\| &\geq -\|u-v\|,
\end{align}$$

Combining these two statements gives:
$$\begin{align}
&-\|u-v\| \leq \|u\|-\|v\| \leq \|u-v\|  \\[4pt]
&\Rightarrow \quad \big|\|u\|-\|v\|\big| \leq \|u-v\|.
\end{align}$$

In the converse, the proof of the triangle inequality from the reverse triangle inequality works in two cases:

- If $\|u +v\| - \|u\| \geq 0,$ then by the reverse triangle inequality,
  $$\begin{align}
&\|u +v\| - \|u\| = {\big|}\|u + v\|-\|u\|{\big|} \leq \|(u + v) - u\| = \|v\|  \\[4pt]
&\Rightarrow \quad \|u + v\| \leq \|u\| + \|v\|
\end{align}$$
- And if $\|u +v\| - \|u\| < 0,$ then trivially
  $$\|u\| +\|v\| \geq \|u\| > \|u + v\|$$
  by the nonnegativity of the norm.

Thus, in both cases, we find that
$$\|u\| + \|v\| \geq \|u + v\|.$$

For metric spaces, the proof of the reverse triangle inequality is found similarly by:
$$\begin{align}
d(A, B) + d(B, C) &\geq d(A, C) \\[4pt]
\Rightarrow \quad d(A, B) &\geq d(A, C) - d(B, C) \\[10pt]
d(C, A) + d(A, B) &\geq d(C, B) \\[4pt]
\Rightarrow \quad d(A, B) &\geq d(B, C) - d(A, C)
\end{align}$$
Putting these equations together we find:
$$d(A, B) \geq |d(A, C) - d(B, C)|$$

And in the converse, beginning from the reverse triangle inequality, we can again use two cases:

- If $d(A, C) - d(B, C) \geq 0$, then
  $$\begin{align}
&d(A, B) \geq |d(A, C) - d(B, C)| = d(A, C) - d(B, C) \\[4pt]
&\Rightarrow \quad d(A, B) + d(B, C) \geq d(A, C)
\end{align}$$
- And if $d(A, C) - d(B, C) < 0,$ then
  $$d(A, B) + d(B, C) \geq d(B, C) > d(A, C)$$
  again by the nonnegativity of the metric.

Thus, in both cases, we find that
$$d(A, B) + d(B, C) \geq d(A, C).$$

== Reversal in Minkowski space ==
The Minkowski space metric $\eta_{\mu \nu}$ is not positive-definite, which means that $\|u\|^2 = \eta_{\mu \nu} u^\mu u^\nu$ can have either sign or vanish, even if the vector u is non-zero. Moreover, if u and v are both timelike vectors lying in the future light cone, the triangle inequality is reversed:

$$\|u+v\| \geq \|u\| + \|v\|.$$

A physical example of this inequality is the twin paradox in special relativity. The same reversed form of the inequality holds if both vectors lie in the past light cone, and if one or both are null vectors. The result holds in $n + 1$ dimensions for any $n \geq 1$. If the plane defined by $u$ and $v$ is space-like (and therefore a Euclidean subspace) then the usual triangle inequality holds.

== See also ==
- Broken stick problem
- Subadditivity
- Minkowski inequality
- Ptolemy's inequality
