= Zindler curve =

Figure 1: Zindler curve. Any of the chords of equal length cuts the curve and the enclosed area into halves.

Figure 2: Examples of Zindler curves with a = 8 (blue), a = 16 (green) and a = 24 (red).

A Zindler curve is a simple closed plane curve with the defining property that:

(L) All chords which cut the curve length into halves have the same length.

The most simple examples are circles. The Austrian mathematician Konrad Zindler discovered further examples, and gave a method to construct them. Herman Auerbach was the first, who used (in 1938) the now established name Zindler curve.

Auerbach proved that a figure bounded by a Zindler curve and with half the density of water will float in water in any position. This gives a negative answer to the bidimensional version of Stanislaw Ulam's problem on floating bodies (Problem 19 of the Scottish Book), which asks if the disk is the only figure of uniform density which will float in water in any position (the original problem asks if the sphere is the only solid having this property in three dimension).

Zindler curves are also connected to the problem of establishing if it is possible to determine the direction of the motion of a bicycle given only the closed rear and front tracks.

== Equivalent definitions ==
An equivalent definition of a Zindler curve is the following one:

(A) All chords which cut the area into halves have the same length.

These chords are the same, which cut the curve length into halves.

Another definition is based on Zindler carousels of two chairs. Consider two smooth curves in R² given by λ_{1} and λ_{2}. Suppose that the distance between points λ_{1}(t) and λ_{2}(t) are constant for each t ∈ R and that the curve defined by the midpoints between λ_{1} and λ_{2} is such that its tangent vector at the point t is parallel to the segment from λ_{1}(t) to λ_{2}(t) for each t. If the curves λ_{1} and λ_{2} parametrizes the same smooth closed curve, then this curve is a Zindler curve.

== Examples ==
Consider a fixed real parameter $a$. For $a>4$, any of the curves

$$z(u)= x(u) +iy(u)=e^{2iu}+2e^{-iu} +ae^{iu/2}\; , \  u\in [0,4\pi]\; ,$$

is a Zindler curve. For $a\ge 24$ the curve is even convex. The diagram shows curves for $a=8$ (blue), $a=16$ (green) and $a=24$ (red). For $a\ge 8$ the curves are related to a curve of constant width.

Figure 3: Sample curve with a=4 is NOT a Zindler curve, because there are desired chords, which intersects the curve at a third point.

Proof of (L): The derivative of the parametric equation is

$z'(u)=i\Big(2e^{2iu}-2e^{-iu} +\frac{a}{2}e^{iu/2}\Big) \;$ and
$$|z'(u)|^2=z'(u)\overline{z'(u)}= \cdots =8+\frac{a^2}{4}-8\cos 3u \; .$$

$|z'(u)|$ is $2\pi$-periodic. Hence for any $u_0$ the following equation holds

$$\int_{u_0}^{u_0+2\pi} |z'(u)| \, du = \int_0^{2\pi} |z'(u)|\,du \; ,$$

which is half the length of the entire curve. The desired chords, which divide the curve into halves are bounded by the points $\;z(u_0)\; ,\;z(u_0+2\pi)\;$ for any $u_0 \in [0,4\pi]$. The length of such a chord is $|z(u_0+2\pi)-z(u_0)|= \cdots =|2ae^{iu_0/2}|=2a \; ,$ hence independent of $u_0$. ∎

For $a=4$ the desired chords meet the curve in an additional point (see Figure 3). Hence only for $a>4$ the sample curves are Zindler curves.

== Generalizations ==
The property defining Zindler curves can also be generalized to chords that cut the perimeter of the curve in a fixed ratio α different from 1/2. In this case, one may consider a chord system (a continuous selection of chords) instead of all chords of the curve. These curves are known as α-Zindler curves, and are Zindler curves for α = 1/2. This generalization of Zindler curve has the following property related to the floating problem: let γ be a closed smooth curve with a chord system cutting the perimeter in a fixed ratio α. If all the chords of this chord system are in the interior of the region bounded by γ, then γ is a α-Zindler curve if and only if the region bounded by γ is a solid of uniform density ρ that floats in any orientation.

== See also ==
- Curve of constant width
- Reuleaux polygon
