= Wendel's theorem =

Theorem in probability theory

In geometric probability theory, Wendel's theorem, named after James G. Wendel, gives the probability that N points distributed uniformly at random on an $n$-dimensional hypersphere all lie on the same "half" of the hypersphere. In other words, one seeks the probability that there is some half-space with the origin on its boundary that contains all N points. Wendel's theorem says that the probability is

$$p_{n,N}=2^{-N+1}\sum_{k=0}^{n-1}\binom{N-1}{k}.$$

The statement is equivalent to $p_{n,N}$ being the probability that the origin is not contained in the convex hull of the N points and holds for any probability distribution on R^{n} that is symmetric around the origin. In particular this includes all distribution which are rotationally invariant around the origin.

This is essentially a probabilistic restatement of Schläfli's theorem that $N$ hyperplanes in general position in $\R^n$ divides it into $2\sum_{k=0}^{n-1}\binom{N-1}{k}$ regions.
