= Friedrich Schilling =

German mathematician (1868–1950)

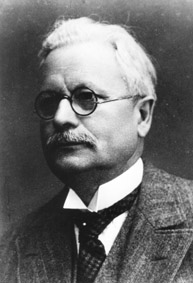
Friedrich Schilling

Friedrich Georg Schilling (9 April 1868, Hildesheim – 25 May 1950, Gladbeck) was a German mathematician.

== Biography ==
From 1887 Schilling studied mathematics at the University of Freiburg and the University of Göttingen, where he received his doctorate in 1893. His doctoral thesis Beiträge zur geometrischen Theorie der Schwarzschen s-Funktion (Contributions to the geometric theory of the Schwarz s-function) was supervised by Felix Klein. At the University of Göttingen, Schilling was from 1891 to 1893 an assistant for the physical model and instrument collection. He habilitated in 1896 in Aachen and was, from August 1897 to April 1899, an adjunct professor (außerplanmäßiger Professor) at the Karlsruhe Institute of Technology. From 1899 he was an adjunct professor at the University of Göttingen, where he taught descriptive geometry and oversaw the collection of mathematical equipment. In 1904 he became a professor at the TH Danzig, where he was rector from 1917 to 1919. He retired in 1936.

In his dissertation, he developed a new interpretation of the formulas of spherical trigonometry as a relationship between the invariants of three quadratic forms and their functional determinants. Schilling's theory was presented by Felix Klein in his lectures on hypergeometric functions.

Schilling also did research on Reuleaux tetrahedra.

He took notes on and edited the lectures on higher geometry by Felix Klein from 1892/93, which were initially distributed in autographed form. In 1926 Felix Klein's book Vorlesungen über nichteuklidische Geometrie (Lectures on non-Euclidean geometry) was published posthumously by Springer Verlag. Schilling himself wrote several books on non-Euclidean geometry, which were strongly influenced by his geometric intuition. Felix Klein and Friedrich Schilling also designed geometric models that were manufactured by the Martin Schilling company in Leipzig.

In 1927 Friedrich Schilling was president of the Deutsche Mathematiker-Vereinigung. In November 1933, he signed the Bekenntnis der Professoren an den deutschen Universitäten und Hochschulen zu Adolf Hitler.

== Selected publications ==
- Über die Anwendungen der darstellenden Geometrie insbesondere über die Photogrammetrie. Mit einem Anhang: Welche Vorteile gewährt die Benützung eines Projektionsapparates im mathematischen Unterricht, Teubner 1904
- F. Schilling: Bildende Kunst und Geometrie, Jahresbericht DMV 1918
- Projektive und nichteuklidische Geometrie, Leipzig 1931
- Die Pseudosphäre und die nichteuklidische Geometrie, 2 vols., Teubner 1931, 1935 (See pseudosphere.)
- Pseudosphärische, hyperbolisch-sphärische und elliptisch-sphärische Geometrie, Teubner 1937

== Sources ==
- Beiträge und Dokumente zur Geschichte der Technischen Hochschule Danzig 1904–1945, Hannover 1979
- brief biography in Frei, Günther, ed. (1985). Der Briefwechsel David Hilbert–Felix Klein 1886–1918. Vandenhoeck und Ruprecht.
