= Barbier's theorem =

All curves of constant width have the same perimeter

These Reuleaux polygons have constant width, and all have the same width; therefore by Barbier's theorem they also have equal perimeters.

In geometry, Barbier's theorem states that every curve of constant width has perimeter π times its width, regardless of its precise shape. This theorem was first published by Joseph-Émile Barbier in 1860.

== Examples ==
The most familiar examples of curves of constant width are the circle and the Reuleaux triangle. For a circle, the width is the same as the diameter; a circle of width w has perimeter πw. A Reuleaux triangle of width w consists of three arcs of circles of radius w. Each of these arcs has central angle π/3, so the perimeter of the Reuleaux triangle of width w is equal to half the perimeter of a circle of radius w and therefore is equal to πw. A similar analysis of other simple examples such as Reuleaux polygons gives the same answer.

== Proofs ==
One proof of the theorem uses the properties of Minkowski sums. If K is a body of constant width w, then the Minkowski sum of K and its 180° rotation is a disk with radius w and perimeter 2πw. The Minkowski sum acts linearly on the perimeters of convex bodies, so the perimeter of K must be half the perimeter of this disk, which is πw as the theorem states.

Alternatively, the theorem follows immediately from the Crofton formula in integral geometry according to which the length of any curve equals the measure of the set of lines that cross the curve, multiplied by their numbers of crossings. Any two curves that have the same constant width are crossed by sets of lines with the same measure, and therefore they have the same length. Historically, Crofton derived his formula later than, and independently of, Barbier's theorem.

An elementary probabilistic proof of the theorem can be found at Buffon's noodle.

== Higher dimensions ==
The analogue of Barbier's theorem for surfaces of constant width is false. In particular, the unit sphere has surface area $4\pi\approx 12.566$, while the surface of revolution of a Reuleaux triangle with the same constant width has surface area $8\pi-\tfrac{4}{3}\pi^2\approx 11.973$.

Instead, Barbier's theorem generalizes to bodies of constant brightness, three-dimensional convex sets for which every two-dimensional projection has the same area. These all have the same surface area as a sphere of the same projected area.

And in general, if $S$ is a convex subset of $\R^{n}$, for which every (n−1)-dimensional projection has area of the unit ball in $\R^{n-1}$, then the surface area of $S$ is equal to that of the unit sphere in $\R^{n}$. This follows from the general form of Crofton formula.

== See also ==
- Blaschke–Lebesgue theorem and isoperimetric inequality, bounding the areas of curves of constant width
