= Broken stick problem =

Problem in geometric probability

Four views of the broken stick problem. Upper left: A line segment (the unit interval) broken into three parts by two random points x and y. Upper right: A triangle having side lengths equal to the three parts. Lower left: Henri Poincaré's visualization using the three part lengths as barycentric coordinates in an equilateral triangle. The blue shaded medial triangle, of 1/4 the area, corresponds to the partitions that form triangles. Lower right: Richard Hamming's visualization using the two split points as Cartesian coordinates in a unit square. The blue shaded crossed square, of 1/4 the area, corresponds to the partitions that form triangles.

In geometric probability, the broken stick problem asks for the probability that one can form a triangle from the three parts of a line segment that has been split randomly into three parts. Three line segments form a triangle if and only if they obey the triangle inequality: each segment's length is less than the sum of the other two lengths. The problem was posed by Emanuel Czuber in 1884. As with other problems in geometric probability, the answer depends on how one formalizes this random split using a probability distribution.

For two split points that are chosen uniformly and independently in the given line segment, the three lengths can be represented as the three barycentric coordinates of a point in an equilateral triangle whose height is the length of the original line segment, or equivalently as the three distances of the point from the sides of the triangle. (This is an application of Viviani's theorem.) For this two-dimensional interpretation of the problem, found by Henri Poincaré, the uniform distribution of the two split points corresponds to a uniform distribution of points within the equilateral triangle, and a pair of split points that forms a triangle corresponds to a point within the medial triangle of the given triangle. The area of the medial triangle is $\tfrac14$ the area of the outer equilateral triangle, and so for this distribution of split points, the probability of forming a triangle is $\tfrac14$.

An alternative two-dimensional interpretation uses the two split points as the Cartesian coordinates of a point in the unit square; the region of the unit square in which the two splits form three segments of a triangle is a crossed square with its vertices at the midpoints of the unit square, again having area $\tfrac14$ of the total.

An alternative probability distribution chooses the first split point uniformly at random, chooses one of the two resulting line segments randomly (with probability $\tfrac12$ of choosing each segment), and then chooses a second split point uniformly at random within the chosen segment. For this model of the problem, the probability of forming a triangle is $\tfrac16$.

A generalization of the problem asks whether a line segment broken into $k$ pieces can form a $k$-gon.
