= Surface of constant width =

Geometrical body

Unsolved problem in mathematics
What is the minimum volume among all shapes of the same constant width?
More unsolved problems in mathematics
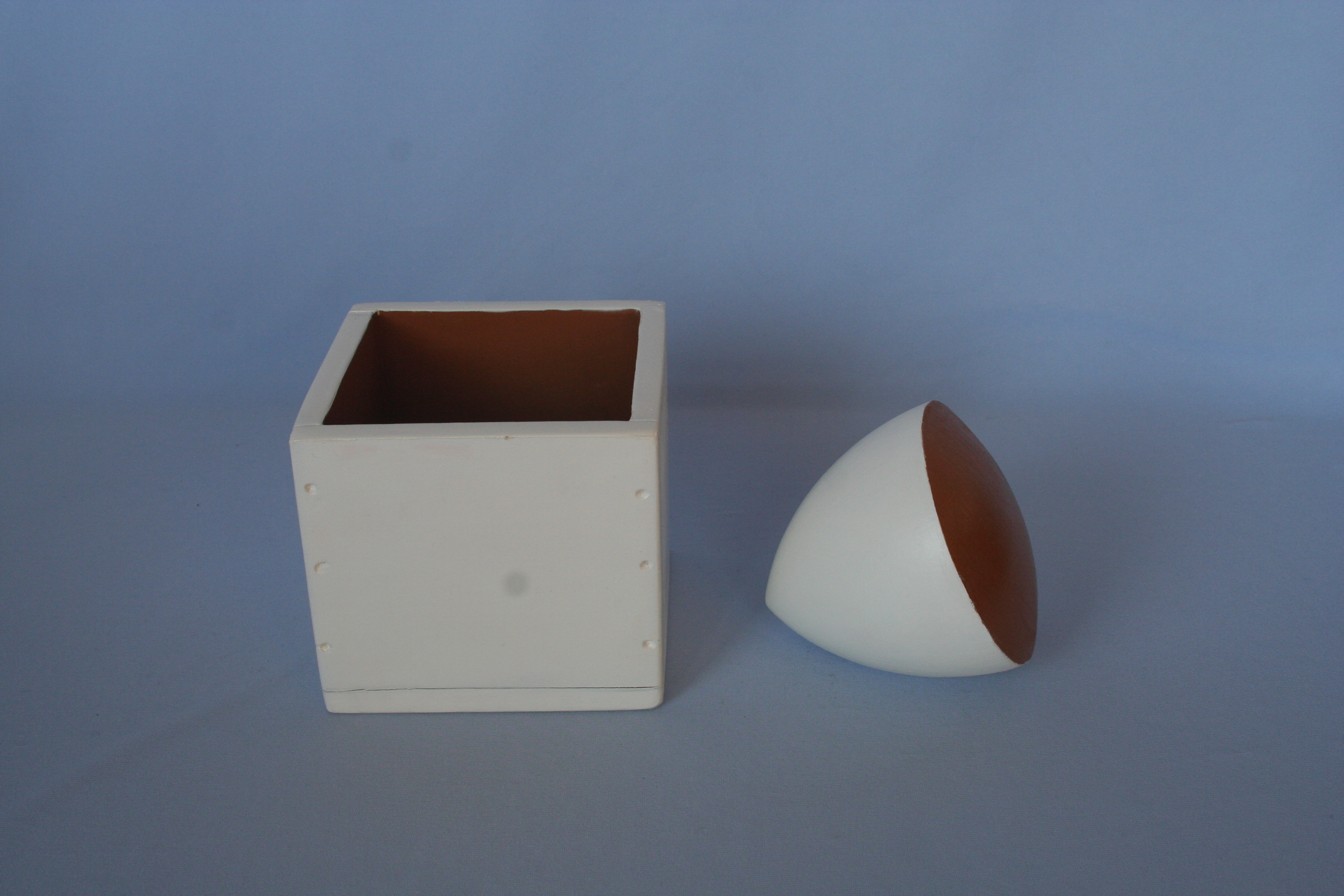
Surface of revolution of a Reuleaux triangle, from the Mathematical Model Collection Marburg

In geometry, a surface of constant width is a convex form whose width, measured by the distance between two opposite parallel planes touching its boundary, is the same regardless of the direction of those two parallel planes. One defines the width of the surface in a given direction to be the perpendicular distance between the parallels perpendicular to that direction. Thus, a surface of constant width is the three-dimensional analogue of a curve of constant width, a two-dimensional shape with a constant distance between pairs of parallel tangent lines.

== Definition ==
More generally, any compact convex body D has one pair of parallel supporting planes in a given direction. A supporting plane is a plane that intersects the boundary of D but not the interior of D. One defines the width of the body as before. If the width of D is the same in all directions, then one says that the body is of constant width and calls its boundary a surface of constant width, and the body itself is referred to as a spheroform.

== Examples ==
A sphere, a surface of constant radius and thus diameter, is a surface of constant width.

Contrary to common belief the Reuleaux tetrahedron is not a surface of constant width. However, there are two different ways of smoothing subsets of the edges of the Reuleaux tetrahedron to form Meissner tetrahedra, surfaces of constant width. These shapes were conjectured by Bonnesen & Fenchel (1934) to have the minimum volume among all shapes with the same constant width, but this conjecture remains unsolved.

Among all surfaces of revolution with the same constant width, the one with minimum volume is the shape swept out by a Reuleaux triangle rotating about one of its axes of symmetry, while the one with maximum volume is the sphere.

== Properties ==
Every parallel projection of a surface of constant width is a curve of constant width. By Barbier's theorem, the perimeter of this projection is π times the width, regardless of the direction of projection. It follows that every surface of constant width is also a surface of constant girth, where the girth of a shape is the perimeter of one of its parallel projections. Conversely, Hermann Minkowski proved that every surface of constant girth is also a surface of constant width.

The shapes whose parallel projections have constant area (rather than constant perimeter) are called bodies of constant brightness.

== Higher dimensions ==
Many 3-dimensional questions have n-dimensional analogues still seeking definitive answers. For example, Oded Schramm asked for bounds on the volume of a convex $n$-dimensional body of constant width. He provided a lower bound, and asked if there exists an example whose volume is significantly smaller than the n-ball $\mathbb{B}^{n}$ of the same width. In 2025, Arman, Bondarenko, Nazarov, Prymak and Radchenko provided such an estimate: for sufficiently large $n$, there exists an $n$-body $K$ of constant width with $\text{Vol}(K)\leq (0.9)^n\text{Vol}(\mathbb{B}^{n} )$.
