= Reuleaux tetrahedron =

Shape formed by intersecting four balls

Animation of a Reuleaux tetrahedron, showing also the tetrahedron from which it is formed

The Reuleaux tetrahedron is the intersection of four balls of radius s centered at the vertices of a regular tetrahedron with side length s. The spherical surface of the ball centered on each vertex passes through the other three vertices, which also form vertices of the Reuleaux tetrahedron. Thus the center of each ball is on the surfaces of the other three balls. The Reuleaux tetrahedron has the same face structure as a regular tetrahedron, but with curved faces: four vertices, and four curved faces, connected by six circular-arc edges.

This shape is defined and named by analogy to the Reuleaux triangle, a two-dimensional curve of constant width; both shapes are named after Franz Reuleaux, a 19th-century German engineer who did pioneering work on ways that machines translate one type of motion into another. One can find repeated claims in the mathematical literature that the Reuleaux tetrahedron is analogously a surface of constant width, but it is not true: the two midpoints of opposite edge arcs are separated by a larger distance,

$$\left(\sqrt3 - \frac{\sqrt2}2 \right) \cdot s \approx 1.0249\,s.$$

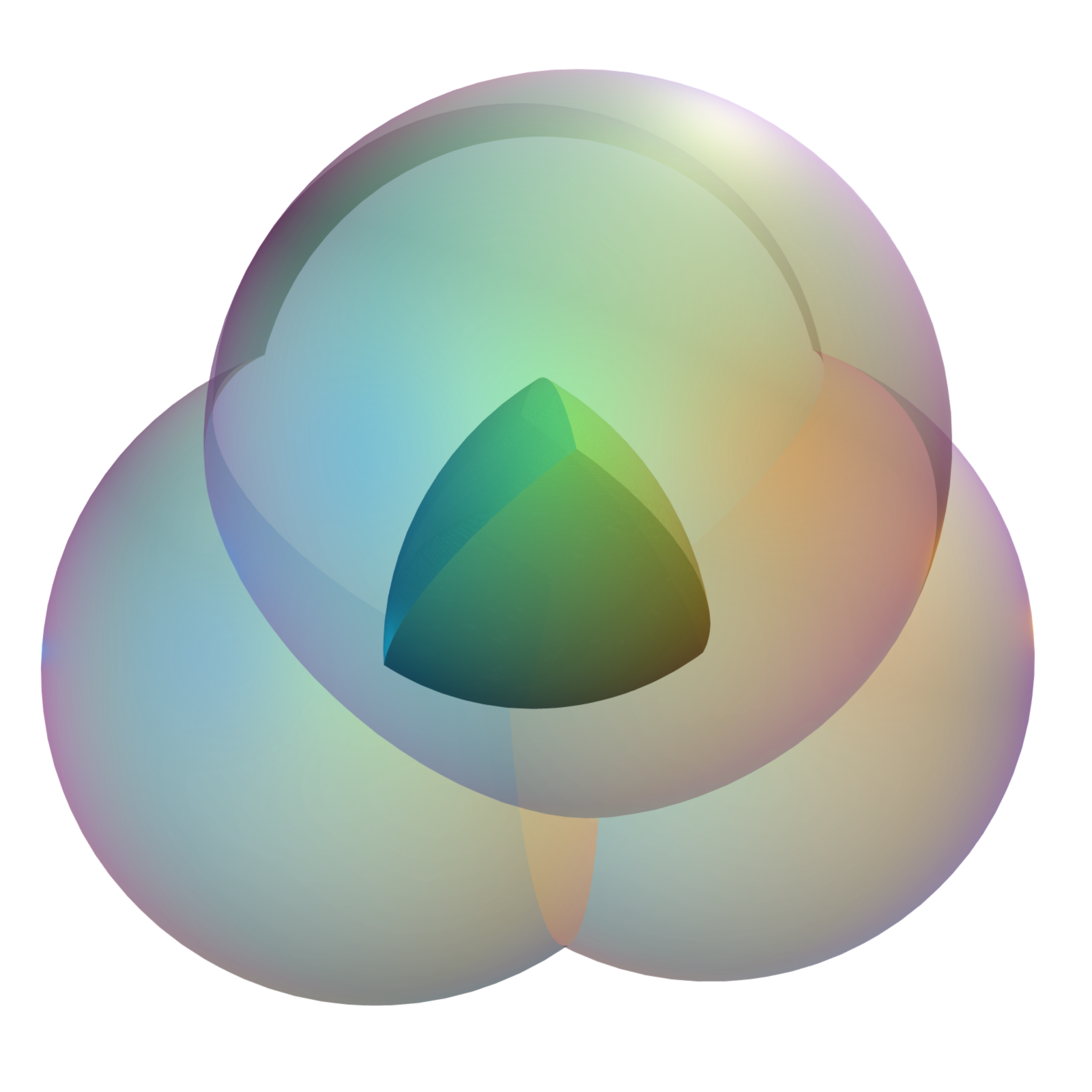
Four balls intersect to form a Reuleaux tetrahedron.

Reuleaux tetrahedron 3D model

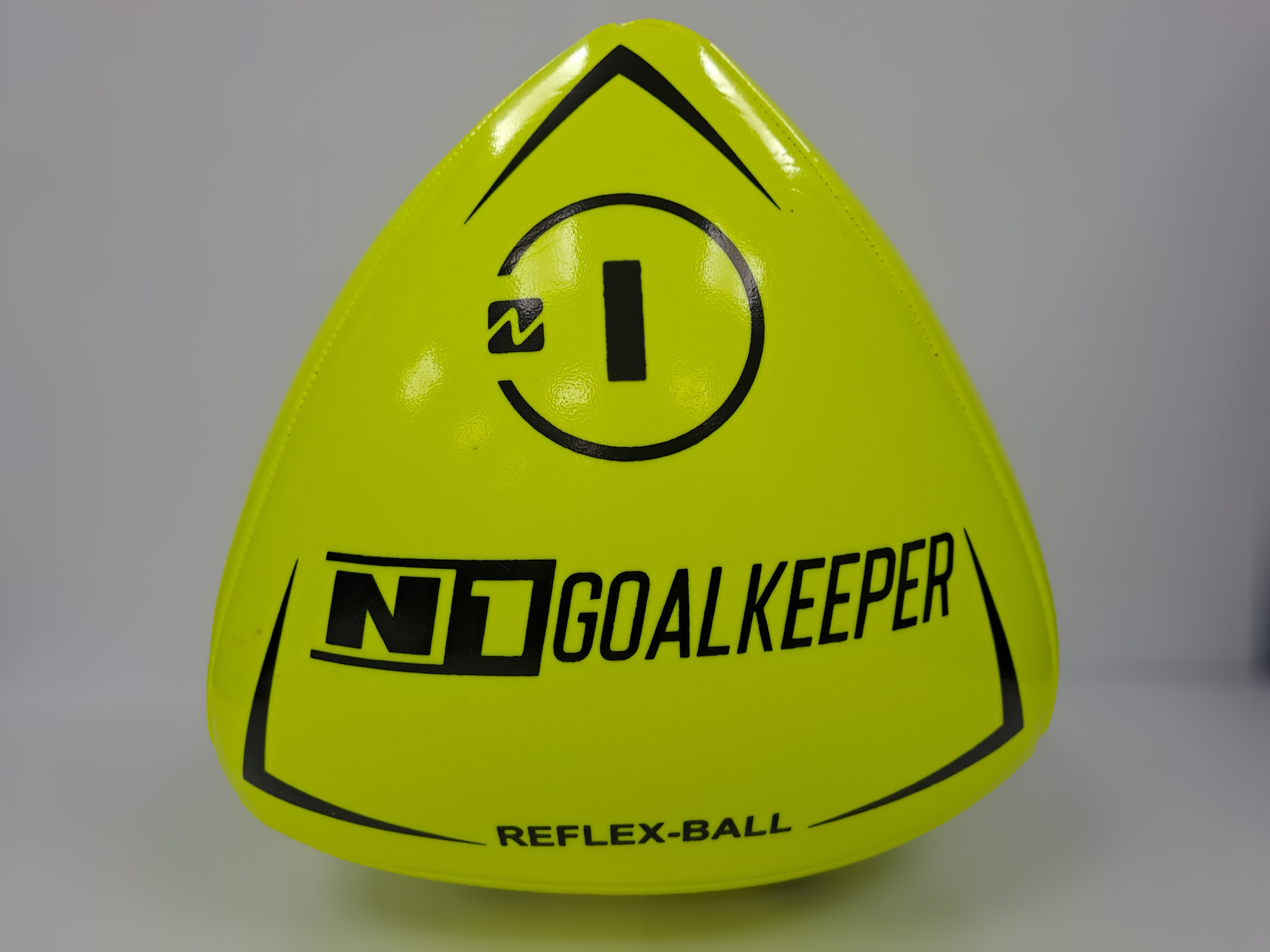
Reflex ball for goalkeeper training

== Volume and surface area ==
The volume of a Reuleaux tetrahedron is

$$\frac{s^3}{12}\big(3\sqrt2 - 49\pi + 162\tan^{-1}\sqrt{2}\big) =
\frac{s^3}{12}\left(32\pi - 81\cos^{-1}\left(\tfrac 1 3\right) + 3\sqrt{2}\right) \approx 0.422\,s^3.$$

The surface area is

$$\left[8\pi - 18\cos^{-1}\left(\tfrac 1 3\right)\right] s^2 \approx 2.975\,s^2.$$

== Meissner bodies ==
Ernst Meissner and Friedrich Schilling showed how to modify the Reuleaux tetrahedron to form a surface of constant width, by replacing three of its edge arcs by curved patches formed as the surfaces of rotation of a circular arc. According to which three edge arcs are replaced (three that have a common vertex or three that form a triangle) there result two noncongruent shapes that are sometimes called Meissner bodies or Meissner tetrahedra.

Unsolved problem in mathematics
Are the two Meissner tetrahedra the minimum-volume three-dimensional shapes of constant width?
More unsolved problems in mathematics

Bonnesen and Fenchel conjectured that Meissner tetrahedra are the minimum-volume three-dimensional shapes of constant width, a conjecture which is still open. In 2011 Anciaux and Guilfoyle proved that the minimizer must consist of pieces of spheres and tubes over curves, which, being true for the Meissner tetrahedra, supports the conjecture.

In connection with this problem, Campi, Colesanti and Gronchi showed that the minimum-volume surface of revolution with constant width is the surface of revolution of a Reuleaux triangle through one of its symmetry axes.

Man Ray's painting Hamlet was based on a photograph he took of a Meissner tetrahedron, which he thought of as resembling both Yorick's skull and Ophelia's breast from Shakespeare's Hamlet.
