= Body of constant brightness =

In convex geometry, a body of constant brightness is a three-dimensional convex set all of whose two-dimensional projections have equal area. A sphere is a body of constant brightness, but others exist. Bodies of constant brightness are a generalization of curves of constant width, but are not the same as another generalization, the surfaces of constant width.

The name comes from interpreting the body as a shining body with isotropic luminance, then a photo (with focus at infinity) of the body taken from any angle would have the same total light energy hitting the photo.

== Properties ==
A body has constant brightness if and only if the reciprocal Gaussian curvatures at pairs of opposite points of tangency of parallel supporting planes have almost-everywhere-equal sums.

According to an analogue of Barbier's theorem, all bodies of constant brightness that have the same projected area $A$ as each other also have the same surface area, $\textstyle\sqrt{A/\pi}$. This can be proved by the Crofton formula.

== Example ==
The first known body of constant brightness that is not a sphere was constructed by Wilhelm Blaschke in 1915. Its boundary is a surface of revolution of a curved triangle (but not the Reuleaux triangle). It is smooth except on a circle and at one isolated point where it is crossed by the axis of revolution. The circle separates two patches of different geometry from each other: one of these two patches is a spherical cap, and the other forms part of a football, a surface of constant Gaussian curvature with a pointed tip. Pairs of parallel supporting planes to this body have one plane tangent to a singular point (with reciprocal curvature zero) and the other tangent to the one of these two patches, which both have the same curvature. Among bodies of revolution of constant brightness, Blaschke's shape (also called the Blaschke–Firey body) is the one with minimum volume, and the sphere is the one with maximum volume.

Additional examples can be obtained by combining multiple bodies of constant brightness using the Blaschke sum, an operation on convex bodies that preserves the property of having constant brightness.

== Relation to constant width ==
A curve of constant width in the Euclidean plane has an analogous property: all of its one-dimensional projections have equal length. In this sense, the bodies of constant brightness are a three-dimensional generalization of this two-dimensional concept, different from the surfaces of constant width.

Since the work of Blaschke, it has been conjectured that the only shape that has both constant brightness and constant width is a sphere. This was formulated explicitly by Soji Nakajima in 1926, and it came to be known as Nakajima's problem. Nakajima himself proved the conjecture under the additional assumption that the boundary of the shape is smooth. A proof of the full conjecture was published in 2006 by Ralph Howard.
