= Geometric probability =

Mathematical concept

Problems of the following type, and their solution techniques, were first studied in the 17th century, and the general topic became known as geometric probability.

- Buffon's needle problem: What is the chance that a needle dropped randomly onto a floor marked with equally spaced parallel lines will cross one of the lines?
- Bertrand's paradox: What is the mean length of a random chord of a unit circle?
- Broken stick problem: If a line segment is broken randomly into three pieces, what is the probability that they form the three side lengths of a triangle?
- Sylvester's four point problem: If four points in the plane are chosen randomly, what is the probability that they form the four vertices of a convex quadrilateral?

For mathematical development see the concise monograph by Solomon. The earliest known problem in the field was studied and discussed by Isaac Newton in a private manuscript dating to 1664-1666, with problem analyzing the likelihood of a negligible ball landing in one of two unequal sectors of a circle. His analysis established the fundamental principle that chance is proportional to area fraction, noted that probability can be irrational, and proposed a frequency experiment for chance estimation, leading to the founding of stereology.

Since the late 20th century, the topic has split into two topics with different emphases. Integral geometry sprang from the principle that the mathematically natural probability models are those that are invariant under certain transformation groups. This topic emphasises systematic development of formulas for calculating expected values associated with the geometric objects derived from random points, and can in part be viewed as a sophisticated branch of multivariate calculus. Stochastic geometry emphasises the random geometrical objects themselves. For instance: different models for random lines or for random tessellations of the plane; random sets formed by making points of a spatial Poisson process be (say) centers of discs.

== See also ==
- Wendel's theorem
