= Integral geometry =

Concept in mathematics

In mathematics, integral geometry is the theory of measures on a geometrical space invariant under the symmetry group of that space. In more recent times, the meaning has been broadened to include a view of invariant (or equivariant) transformations from the space of functions on one geometrical space to the space of functions on another geometrical space. Such transformations often take the form of integral transforms such as the Radon transform and its generalizations.

== Classical context ==
Integral geometry as such first emerged as an attempt to refine certain statements of geometric probability theory. The early work of Luis Santaló and Wilhelm Blaschke was in this connection. It follows from the classic theorem of Crofton expressing the length of a plane curve as an expectation of the number of intersections with a random line. Here the word 'random' must be interpreted as subject to correct symmetry considerations.

There is a sample space of lines, one on which the affine group of the plane acts. A probability measure is sought on this space, invariant under the symmetry group. If, as in this case, we can find a unique such invariant measure, then that solves the problem of formulating accurately what 'random line' means and expectations become integrals with respect to that measure. (Note for example that the phrase 'random chord of a circle' can be used to construct some paradoxes—for example Bertrand's paradox.)

We can therefore say that integral geometry in this sense is the application of probability theory (as axiomatized by Kolmogorov) in the context of the Erlangen programme of Klein. The content of the theory is effectively that of invariant (smooth) measures on (preferably compact) homogeneous spaces of Lie groups; and the evaluation of integrals of the differential forms.

A very celebrated case is the problem of Buffon's needle: drop a needle on a floor made of planks and calculate the probability the needle lies across a crack. Generalising, this theory is applied to various stochastic processes concerned with geometric and incidence questions. See stochastic geometry.

One of the most interesting theorems in this form of integral geometry is Hadwiger's theorem in the Euclidean setting. Subsequently Hadwiger-type theorems were established in various settings, notably in hermitian geometry, using advanced tools from valuation theory.

The more recent meaning of integral geometry is that of Sigurdur Helgason and Israel Gelfand. It deals more specifically with integral transforms, modeled on the Radon transform. Here the underlying geometrical incidence relation (points lying on lines, in Crofton's case) is seen in a freer light, as the site for an integral transform composed as pullback onto the incidence graph and then push forward.

== Example ==
The positive real numbers $( \reals_{>0}, \ \times)$ form a locally-compact topological group and thus, by a theorem of Alfréd Haar, is expected to have a measure μ that satisfies μ(A) = μ(s A) for every measurable set A and every $s \in \reals_{>0} .$

To make a representation of μ, the properties of area in the quadrant R_{>0} × R_{>0} are used. A diagonal matrix, with s and 1/s on the diagonal, transforms the quadrant while preserving area. It moves hyperbolic sectors that correspond to hyperbolic angles. The sectors can also be read as four-sided and against an asymptote. It is this version that is used to provide the formula $\int_a^b \frac{dx}{x} \ = \ \log (b/a)$ in the standard course of integral calculus.
