= Supporting line =

Parallel supporting lines of a Reuleaux triangle

Animation of parallel supporting lines around a Reuleaux triangle.

In geometry, a supporting line L of a curve C in the plane is a line that contains a point of C, but does not separate any two points of C. In other words, C lies completely in one of the two closed half-planes defined by L and has at least one point on L.

== Properties ==
There can be many supporting lines for a curve at a given point. When a tangent exists at a given point, then it is the unique supporting line at this point, if it does not separate the curve.

== Generalizations ==
The notion of supporting line is also discussed for planar shapes. In this case a supporting line may be defined as a line which has common points with the boundary of the shape, but not with its interior.

The notion of a supporting line to a planar curve or convex shape can be generalized to n dimension as a supporting hyperplane.

== Critical support lines ==
If two bounded connected planar shapes have disjoint convex hulls that are separated by a positive distance, then they necessarily have exactly four common lines of support, the bitangents of the two convex hulls. Two of these lines of support separate the two shapes, and are called critical support lines. Without the assumption of convexity, there may be more or fewer than four lines of support, even if the shapes themselves are disjoint. For instance, if one shape is an annulus that contains the other, then there are no common lines of support, while if each of two shapes consists of a pair of small disks at opposite corners of a square then there may be as many as 16 common lines of support.
