= Curve of constant width =

Shape with same width in all directions

Measuring the width of a Reuleaux triangle as the distance between parallel supporting lines. Because this distance does not depend on the direction of the lines, the Reuleaux triangle is a curve of constant width.

In geometry, a curve of constant width is a simple closed curve in the plane whose width (the distance between parallel supporting lines) is the same in all directions. The shape bounded by a curve of constant width is a body of constant width or an orbiform, the name given to these shapes by Leonhard Euler. Standard examples are the circle and the Reuleaux triangle. These curves can also be constructed using circular arcs centered at crossings of an arrangement of lines, as the involutes of certain curves, or by intersecting circles centered on a partial curve.

Every body of constant width is a convex set, its boundary crossed at most twice by any line, and if the line crosses perpendicularly it does so at both crossings, separated by the width. By Barbier's theorem, the body's perimeter is exactly π times its width, but its area depends on its shape, with the Reuleaux triangle having the smallest possible area for its width and the circle the largest. Every superset of a body of constant width includes pairs of points that are farther apart than the width, and every curve of constant width includes at least six points of extreme curvature. Although the Reuleaux triangle is not smooth, curves of constant width can always be approximated arbitrarily closely by smooth curves of the same constant width.

Cylinders with constant-width cross-section can be used as rollers to support a level surface. Another application of curves of constant width is for coinage shapes, where regular Reuleaux polygons are a common choice. The possibility that curves other than circles can have constant width makes it more complicated to check the roundness of an object.

Curves of constant width have been generalized in several ways to higher dimensions and to non-Euclidean geometry.

== Definitions ==
Width, and constant width, are defined in terms of the supporting lines of curves; these are lines that touch a curve without crossing it. Every compact curve in the plane has two supporting lines in any given direction, with the curve sandwiched between them. The Euclidean distance between these two lines is the width of the curve in that direction, and a curve has constant width if this distance is the same for all directions of lines. The width of a bounded convex set can be defined in the same way as for curves, by the distance between pairs of parallel lines that touch the set without crossing it, and a convex set is a body of constant width when this distance is nonzero and does not depend on the direction of the lines. Every body of constant width has a curve of constant width as its boundary, and every curve of constant width has a body of constant width as its convex hull.

Another equivalent way to define the width of a compact curve or of a convex set is by looking at its orthogonal projection onto a line. In both cases, the projection is a line segment, whose length equals the distance between support lines that are perpendicular to the line. So, a curve or a convex set has constant width when all of its orthogonal projections have the same length.

== Examples ==
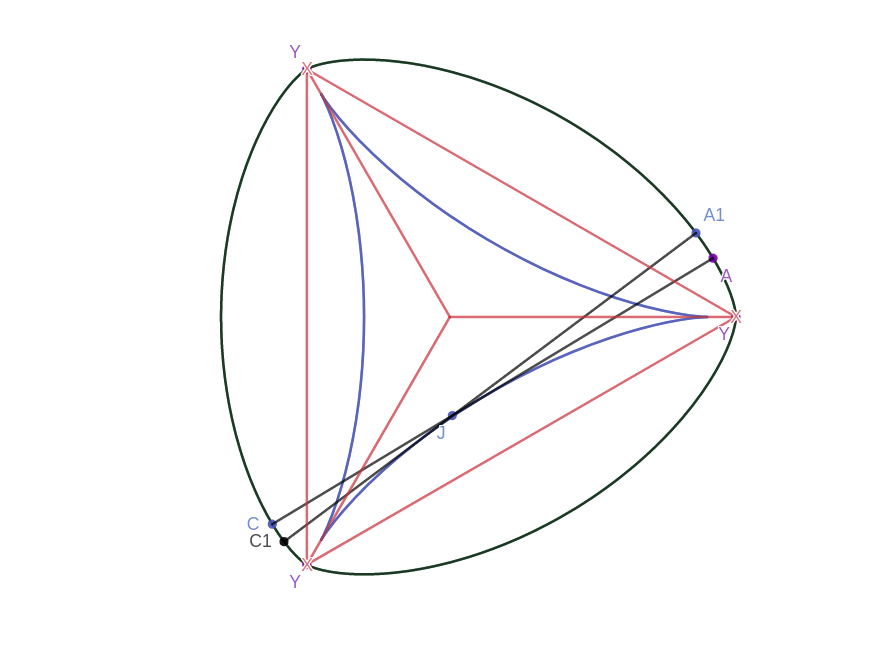
A curve of constant width defined by an 8th-degree polynomial

Circles have constant width, equal to their diameter. On the other hand, squares do not: supporting lines parallel to two opposite sides of the square are closer together than supporting lines parallel to a diagonal. More generally, no polygon can have constant width. However, there are other shapes of constant width. A standard example is the Reuleaux triangle, the intersection of three circles, each centered where the other two circles cross. Its boundary curve consists of three arcs of these circles, meeting at 120° angles, so it is not smooth, and in fact these angles are the sharpest possible for any curve of constant width.

Other curves of constant width can be smooth but non-circular, not even having any circular arcs in their boundary. For instance, the zero set of the polynomial below forms a non-circular smooth algebraic curve of constant width:

$$\begin{align}
f(x,y)={}&(x^2 + y^2)^4 - 45(x^2 + y^2)^3 - 41283(x^2 + y^2)^2\\
& + 7950960(x^2 + y^2) + 16(x^2 - 3y^2)^3 +48(x^2 + y^2)(x^2 - 3y^2)^2\\
&+ x(x^2 - 3y^2)\left(16(x^2 + y^2)^2 - 5544(x^2 + y^2) + 266382\right) - 720^3.
\end{align}$$

Its degree, eight, is the minimum possible degree for a polynomial that defines a non-circular curve of constant width.

== Constructions ==
An irregular Reuleaux polygon

Applying the crossed-lines method to an arrangement of four lines. The boundaries of the blue body of constant width are circular arcs from four nested pairs of circles (inner circles dark red and outer circles light red).

Body of constant width (yellow) formed by intersecting disks (blue) centered on a semi-ellipse (black). The red circle shows a tangent circle to a supporting line, at a point of minimum curvature of the semi-ellipse. The eccentricity of the semi-ellipse in the figure is the maximum possible for this construction.

Every regular polygon with an odd number of sides gives rise to a curve of constant width, a Reuleaux polygon, formed from circular arcs centered at its vertices that pass through the two vertices farthest from the center. For instance, this construction generates a Reuleaux triangle from an equilateral triangle. Some irregular polygons also generate Reuleaux polygons. In a closely related construction, called by Martin Gardner the "crossed-lines method", an arrangement of lines in the plane (no two parallel but otherwise arbitrary) is sorted into cyclic order by the slopes of the lines. The lines are then connected by a curve formed from a sequence of circular arcs; each arc connects two consecutive lines in the sorted order, and is centered at their crossing. The radius of the first arc must be chosen large enough to cause all successive arcs to end on the correct side of the next crossing point; however, all sufficiently-large radii work. For two lines, this forms a circle; for three lines on the sides of an equilateral triangle, with the minimum possible radius, it forms a Reuleaux triangle, and for the lines of a regular star polygon it can form a Reuleaux polygon.

Leonhard Euler constructed curves of constant width from involutes of curves with an odd number of cusp singularities, having only one tangent line in each direction (that is, projective hedgehogs). An intuitive way to describe the involute construction is to roll a line segment around such a curve, keeping it tangent to the curve without sliding along it, until it returns to its starting point of tangency. The line segment must be long enough to reach the cusp points of the curve, so that it can roll past each cusp to the next part of the curve, and its starting position should be carefully chosen so that at the end of the rolling process it is in the same position it started from. When that happens, the curve traced out by the endpoints of the line segment is an involute that encloses the given curve without crossing it, with constant width equal to the length of the line segment. If the starting curve is smooth (except at the cusps), the resulting curve of constant width will also be smooth. An example of a starting curve with the correct properties for this construction is the deltoid curve, and the involutes of the deltoid that enclose it form smooth curves of constant width, not containing any circular arcs.

Another construction chooses half of the curve of constant width, meeting certain requirements, and forms from it a body of constant width having the given curve as part of its boundary. The construction begins with a convex curved arc, whose endpoints are the intended width $w$ apart. The two endpoints must touch parallel supporting lines at distance $w$ from each other. Additionally, each supporting line that touches another point of the arc must be tangent at that point to a circle of radius $w$ containing the entire arc; this requirement prevents the curvature of the arc from being less than that of the circle. The completed body of constant width is then the intersection of the interiors of an infinite family of circles, of two types: the ones tangent to the supporting lines, and more circles of the same radius centered at each point of the given arc. This construction is universal: all curves of constant width may be constructed in this way. Victor Puiseux, a 19th-century French mathematician, found curves of constant width containing elliptical arcs that can be constructed in this way from a semi-ellipse. To meet the curvature condition, the semi-ellipse should be bounded by the semi-major axis of its ellipse, and the ellipse should have eccentricity at most $\tfrac{1}{2}\sqrt{3}$. Equivalently, the semi-major axis should be at most twice the semi-minor axis.

Given any two bodies of constant width, their Minkowski sum forms another body of constant width. A generalization of Minkowski sums to the sums of support functions of hedgehogs produces a curve of constant width from the sum of a projective hedgehog and a circle, whenever the result is a convex curve. All curves of constant width can be decomposed into a sum of hedgehogs in this way.

== Properties ==
The Reuleaux triangle rolling within a square while at all times touching all four sides

A curve of constant width can rotate between two parallel lines separated by its width, while at all times touching those lines, which act as supporting lines for the rotated curve. In the same way, a curve of constant width can rotate within a rhombus or square, whose pairs of opposite sides are separated by the width and lie on parallel support lines. Not every curve of constant width can rotate within a regular hexagon in the same way, because its supporting lines may form different irregular hexagons for different rotations rather than always forming a regular one. However, every curve of constant width can be enclosed by at least one regular hexagon with opposite sides on parallel supporting lines.

A curve has constant width if and only if, for every pair of parallel supporting lines, it touches those two lines at points whose distance equals the separation between the lines. In particular, this implies that it can only touch each supporting line at a single point. Equivalently, every line that crosses the curve perpendicularly crosses it at exactly two points of distance equal to the width. Therefore, a curve of constant width must be convex, since every non-convex simple closed curve has a supporting line that touches it at two or more points. Curves of constant width are examples of self-parallel or auto-parallel curves, curves traced by both endpoints of a line segment that moves in such a way that both endpoints move perpendicularly to the line segment. However, there exist other self-parallel curves, such as the infinite spiral formed by the involute of a circle, that do not have constant width.

Barbier's theorem asserts that the perimeter of any curve of constant width is equal to the width multiplied by $\pi$. As a special case, this formula agrees with the standard formula $\pi d$ for the perimeter of a circle given its diameter. By the isoperimetric inequality and Barbier's theorem, the circle has the maximum area of any curve of given constant width. The Blaschke–Lebesgue theorem says that the Reuleaux triangle has the least area of any convex curve of given constant width. Every proper superset of a body of constant width has strictly greater diameter, and every Euclidean set with this property is a body of constant width. In particular, it is not possible for one body of constant width to be a subset of a different body with the same constant width. Every curve of constant width can be approximated arbitrarily closely by a piecewise circular curve or by an analytic curve of the same constant width.

A Reuleaux triangle and its Wigner caustic, consisting of three circular arcs of radius half the width

The areas bounded by a curve of constant width and by its Wigner caustic (the locus of the midpoints of chords joining pairs of points on the curve with parallel tangent lines) are related by
$$A=\frac{\pi w^2}{4}
-2\left|A^*(W)\right|.$$

A vertex of a smooth curve is a point where its curvature is a local maximum or minimum; for a circular arc, all points are vertices, but non-circular curves may have a finite discrete set of vertices. For a curve that is not smooth, the points where it is not smooth can also be considered as vertices, of infinite curvature. For a curve of constant width, each vertex of locally minimum curvature is paired with a vertex of locally maximum curvature, opposite it on a diameter of the curve, and there must be at least six vertices. This stands in contrast to the four-vertex theorem, according to which every simple closed smooth curve in the plane has at least four vertices. Some curves, such as ellipses, have exactly four vertices, but this is not possible for a curve of constant width. Because local minima of curvature are opposite local maxima of curvature, the only curves of constant width with central symmetry are the circles, for which the curvature is the same at all points. For every curve of constant width, the minimum enclosing circle of the curve and the largest circle that it contains are concentric, and the average of their diameters is the width of the curve. These two circles together touch the curve in at least three pairs of opposite points, but these points are not necessarily vertices.

A convex body has constant width if and only if the Minkowski sum of the body and its 180° rotation is a circular disk; if so, the width of the body is the radius of the disk.

== Applications ==
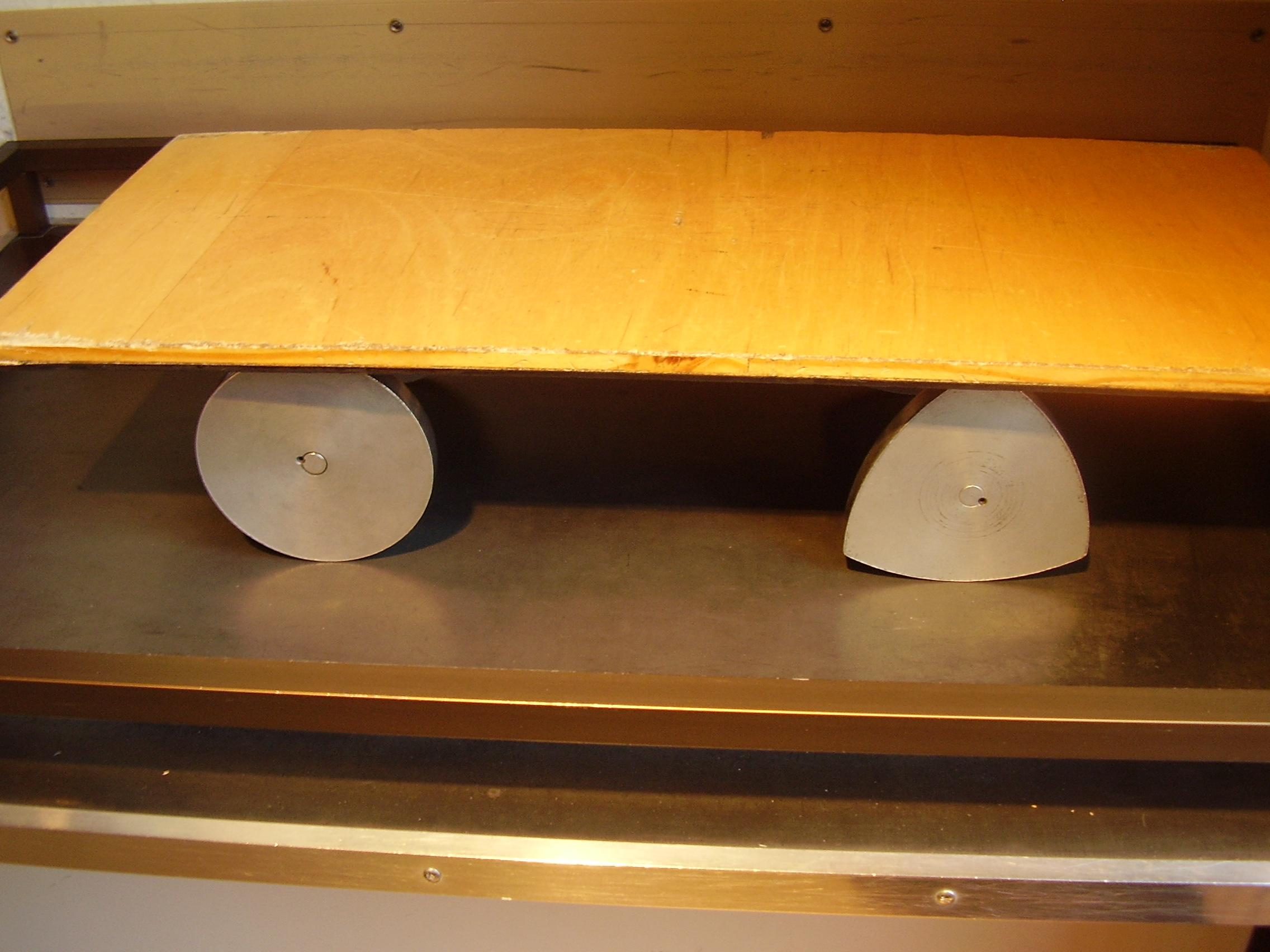
Rollers of constant width

Because of the ability of curves of constant width to roll between parallel lines, any cylinder with a curve of constant width as its cross-section can act as a "roller", supporting a level plane and keeping it flat as it rolls along any level surface. However, the center of the roller moves up and down as it rolls, so this construction would not work for wheels in this shape attached to fixed axles.

Some coinage shapes are non-circular bodies of constant width. For instance the British 20p and 50p coins are Reuleaux heptagons, and the Canadian loonie is a Reuleaux 11-gon. These shapes allow automated coin machines to recognize these coins from their widths, regardless of the orientation of the coin in the machine. On the other hand, testing the width is inadequate to determine the roundness of an object, because such tests cannot distinguish circles from other curves of constant width. Overlooking this fact may have played a role in the Space Shuttle Challenger disaster, as the roundness of sections of the rocket in that launch was tested only by measuring widths, and off-round shapes may cause unusually high stresses that could have been one of the factors causing the disaster.

== Generalizations ==
The curves of constant width can be generalized to certain non-convex curves, the curves that have two tangent lines in each direction, with the same separation between these two lines regardless of their direction. As a limiting case, the projective hedgehogs (curves with one tangent line in each direction) have also been called "curves of zero width".

One way to generalize these concepts to three dimensions is through the surfaces of constant width. The three-dimensional analog of a Reuleaux triangle, the Reuleaux tetrahedron, does not have constant width, but minor changes to it produce the Meissner bodies, which do. The curves of constant width may also be generalized to the bodies of constant brightness, three-dimensional shapes whose two-dimensional projections all have equal area; these shapes obey a generalization of Barbier's theorem. A different class of three-dimensional generalizations, the space curves of constant width, are defined by the properties that each plane that crosses the curve perpendicularly intersects it at exactly one other point, where it is also perpendicular, and that all pairs of points intersected by perpendicular planes are the same distance apart.

Curves and bodies of constant width have also been studied in non-Euclidean geometry and for non-Euclidean normed vector spaces.

== See also ==
- Mean width, the width of a curve averaged over all possible directions
- Zindler curve, a curve in which all perimeter-bisecting chords have the same length
