= Holmgren =

Holmgren is a Swedish surname. Notable people with the surname include:

- Alarik Frithiof Holmgren (1831–1897), Swedish physiologist
- Ann-Margret Holmgren (1850–1940), Swedish historian and feminist
- August Holmgren (born 1998), Danish tennis player
- August Emil Holmgren (1829–1888), Swedish entomologist
- Ava Holmgren (born 2005), Canadian cyclist
- Börje Holmgren (1909–1990), Swedish curler
- Brett Holmgren (born 1981), American intelligence official
- Chet Holmgren (born 2002), American basketball player
- David Holmgren (born 1955), Australian ecological design engineer and writer
- Erik Albert Holmgren (1872–1943), Swedish mathematician.
- Erik Holmgren (born 1964), Finnish football defender
- Emma Holmgren (born 1997), Swedish footballer
- Emil Holmgren (1866–1922), Swedish professor of histology
- Gary Holmgren, American retired light middleweight professional boxer
- Gathania Holmgren (born 1986), Swedish pop singer
- Gunnar Holmgren (born 1999), Canadian cyclist
- Herman Teodor Holmgren (1842–1914), Swedish architect
- Isabella Holmgren (born 2005), Canadian cyclist
- Israel Holmgren (1871–1961), Swedish scientist, physician and professor
- Jan Holmgren (born 1944), Swedish physician and medical researcher
- Janet L. Holmgren, American college administrator and president of Mills College
- Leif Holmgren (born 1953), Swedish ice hockey player
- Mike Holmgren (born 1948), American professional football coach
- Nils Frithiof Holmgren (1877–1954) Swedish zoologist
- Paul Holmgren (born 1955), American professional ice hockey player
- Rolf Holmgren (born 1946), Swedish actor and scriptwriter

== See also ==
- Holmgren's uniqueness theorem, in the theory of partial differential equations, named after Erik Albert Holmgren
