= Torsten Carleman =

Swedish mathematician

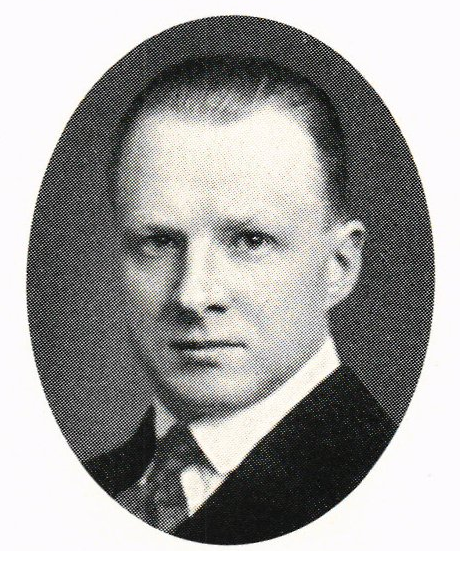
- Born: 8 July 1892; Visseltofta
- Died: 11 January 1949 (aged 56); Stockholm
- Education: Uppsala University
- Known for: Carleman linearization Carleman matrix Carleman's condition Carleman's inequality Carleman's theorem Denjoy–Carleman theorem Denjoy–Carleman–Ahlfors theorem Carleman kernel Carleman formulae Mean ergodic theorem Hilbert-Carleman determinant
- Awards: Björkénska priset (1941); Peccot Lectures (1922)
- Scientific career
- Fields: Mathematics
- Workplaces: Lund University; Stockholm University; Mittag-Leffler Institute
- Doctoral advisor: Erik Albert Holmgren
- Doctoral students: Åke Pleijel; Hans Rådström

Torsten Carleman (8 July 1892, Visseltofta, Osby Municipality – 11 January 1949, Stockholm), born Tage Gillis Torsten Carleman, was a Swedish mathematician, known for his results in classical analysis and its applications. As the director of the Mittag-Leffler Institute for more than two decades, Carleman was the most influential mathematician in Sweden.

== Work ==
The dissertation of Carleman under Erik Albert Holmgren, as well as his work in the early 1920s, was devoted to singular integral equations. He developed the spectral theory of integral operators with Carleman kernels, that is, kernels K(x, y) such that K(y, x) = K̅(x̅, y̅) for almost every (x, y), and

$$\int | K(x, y) |^2 dy < \infty$$

for almost every x.

In the mid-1920s, Carleman developed the theory of quasi-analytic functions. He proved the necessary and sufficient condition for quasi-analyticity, now called the Denjoy–Carleman theorem. As a corollary, he obtained a sufficient condition for the determinacy of the moment problem. As one of the steps in the proof of the Denjoy–Carleman theorem in Carleman (1926), he introduced the Carleman inequality

$$\sum_{n=1}^\infty \left(a_1 a_2 \cdots a_n\right)^{1/n} \le e \sum_{n=1}^\infty a_n,$$

valid for any sequence of non-negative real numbers a_{k}.

At about the same time, he established the Carleman formulae in complex analysis, which reconstruct an analytic function in a domain from its values on a subset of the boundary. He also proved a generalisation of Jensen's formula, now called the Jensen–Carleman formula.

In the 1930s, independently of John von Neumann, he discovered the mean ergodic theorem. Later, he worked in the theory of partial differential equations, where he introduced the Carleman estimates, and found a way to study the spectral asymptotics of Schrödinger operators.

In 1932, following the work of Henri Poincaré, Erik Ivar Fredholm, and Bernard Koopman, he devised the Carleman embedding (also called Carleman linearization), a way to embed a finite-dimensional system of nonlinear differential equations du/dt = P(u) for u: R^{k} → R, where the components of P are polynomials in u, into an infinite-dimensional system of linear differential equations.

In 1933 Carleman published a short proof of what is now called the Denjoy–Carleman–Ahlfors theorem. This theorem states that the number of asymptotic values attained by an entire function of order ρ along curves in the complex plane going outwards toward infinite absolute value is less than or equal to 2ρ.

In 1935, Torsten Carleman introduced a generalisation of Fourier transform, which foreshadowed the work of Mikio Sato on hyperfunctions; his notes were published in Carleman (1944). He considered the functions f of at most polynomial growth, and showed that every such function can be decomposed as f = f_{+} + f_{−}, where f_{+} and f_{−} are analytic in the upper and lower half planes, respectively, and that this representation is essentially unique. Then he defined the Fourier transform of (f_{+}, f_{−}) as another such pair (g_{+}, g_{−}). Though conceptually different, the definition coincides with the one given later by Laurent Schwartz for tempered distributions. Carleman's definition gave rise to numerous extensions.

Returning to mathematical physics in the 1930s, Carleman gave the first proof of global existence for Boltzmann's equation in the kinetic theory of gases (his result applies to the space-homogeneous case). The results were published posthumously in Carleman (1957).

Carleman supervised the Ph.D. theses of Ulf Hellsten, Karl Persson (Dagerholm), Åke Pleijel and (jointly with Fritz Carlson) of Hans Rådström.

== Life ==
Carleman was born in Visseltofta to Alma Linnéa Jungbeck and Karl Johan Carleman, a school teacher. He studied at Växjö Cathedral School, graduating in 1910.

He continued his studies at Uppsala University, being one of the active members of the Uppsala Mathematical Society. Kjellberg recalls:

He was a genius! My older friends in Uppsala used to tell me about the wonderful years they had had when Carleman was there. He was the most active speaker in the Uppsala Mathematical Society and a well-trained gymnast. When people left the seminar crossing the Fyris River, he walked on his hands on the railing of the bridge.

From 1917 he was docent at Uppsala University, and from 1923 — a full professor at Lund University. In 1924 he was appointed professor at Stockholm University. He was elected a member of the Royal Swedish Academy of Sciences in 1926 and of the Finnish Society of Sciences and Letters in 1934. From 1927, he was director of the Mittag-Leffler Institute and editor of Acta Mathematica.

From 1929 to 1946 Carleman was married to Anna-Lisa Lemming (1885–1954), the half-sister of the athlete Eric Lemming who won four golden medals and three bronze at the Olympic Games. During this period he was also known as a recognized fascist, anti-semite and xenophobe. His interaction with William Feller before the former departure to the United States was not particularly pleasant, at some point being reported due to his opinion that "Jews and foreigners should be executed".

Carlson remembers Carleman as: "secluded and taciturn, who looked at life and people with a bitter humour. In his heart, he was inclined to kindliness towards those around him, and strove to assist them swiftly." Towards the end of his life, he remarked to his students that "professors ought to be shot at the age of fifty."

During the last decades of his life, Carleman abused alcohol, according to Norbert Wiener and William Feller. His final years were plagued by neuralgia. At the end of 1948, he developed the liver disease jaundice; he died from complications of the disease.

== Selected publications ==
- Carleman, T. (1926). Les fonctions quasi analytiques (in French). Paris: Gauthier-Villars. JFM 52.0255.02.
- Carleman, T. (1944). L'Intégrale de Fourier et Questions que s'y Rattachent (in French). Uppsala: Publications Scientifiques de l'Institut Mittag-Leffler. MR 0014165.
- Carleman, T. (1957). Problèmes mathématiques dans la théorie cinétique des gaz (in French). Uppsala: Publ. Sci. Inst. Mittag-Leffler. MR 0098477.
- Carleman, Torsten (1960), Pleijel, Ake; Lithner, Lars; Odhnoff, Jan (eds.), Edition Complete Des Articles De Torsten Carleman, Litos reprotryk and l'Institut mathematique Mittag-Leffler
