= Composition ring =

Algebraic structure

In mathematics, a composition ring, introduced in (Adler 1962), is a commutative ring (R, 0, +, −, ·), possibly without an identity 1, together with an operation

$$\circ: R \times R \rightarrow R$$

such that, for any three elements $f,g,h\in R$ one has

1. $(f+g)\circ h=(f\circ h)+(g\circ h)$
2. $(f\cdot g)\circ h = (f\circ h)\cdot (g\circ h)$
3. $(f\circ g)\circ h = f\circ (g\circ h).$

It is not generally the case that $f\circ g=g\circ f$, nor is it generally the case that $f\circ (g+h)$ (or $f\circ (g\cdot h)$) has any algebraic relationship to $f\circ g$ and $f\circ h$.

== Examples ==
There are a few ways to make a commutative ring R into a composition ring without introducing anything new.

- Composition may be defined by $f\circ g=0$ for all f,g.
- Composition may be defined by $f\circ g=f$ for all f,g. This is the composition rule for constant functions.
- If R is a boolean ring, then multiplication may double as composition: $f\circ g=fg$ for all f,g.

More interesting examples can be formed by defining a composition on another ring constructed from R.

- The polynomial ring R[X] is a composition ring where $(f\circ g) (x)=f(g(x))$ for all $f, g \in R$.
- The formal power series ring R[[X]] also has a substitution operation, but it is only defined if the series g being substituted has zero constant term (if not, the constant term of the result would be given by an infinite series with arbitrary coefficients). Therefore, the subset of R[[X]] formed by power series with zero constant coefficient can be made into a composition ring with composition given by the same substitution rule as for polynomials. Since nonzero constant series are absent, this composition ring does not have a multiplicative unit.
- If R is an integral domain, the field R(X) of rational functions also has a substitution operation derived from that of polynomials: substituting a fraction g_{1}/g_{2} for X into a polynomial of degree n gives a rational function with denominator $g_2^n$, and substituting into a fraction is given by

$$\frac{f_1}{f_2}\circ g=\frac{f_1\circ g}{f_2\circ g}.$$

However, as for formal power series, the composition cannot always be defined when the right operand g is a constant: in the formula given the denominator $f_2\circ g$ should not be identically zero. One must therefore restrict to a subring of R(X) to have a well-defined composition operation; a suitable subring is given by the rational functions of which the numerator has zero constant term, but the denominator has nonzero constant term. Again this composition ring has no multiplicative unit; if R is a field, it is in fact a subring of the formal power series example.

- The set of all functions from R to R under pointwise addition and multiplication, and with $\circ$ given by composition of functions, is a composition ring. There are numerous variations of this idea, such as the ring of continuous, smooth, holomorphic, or polynomial functions from a ring to itself, when these concepts makes sense.

For a concrete example take the ring ${\mathbb Z}[x]$, considered as the ring of polynomial maps from the integers to itself. A ring endomorphism

$$F:{\mathbb Z}[x]\rightarrow{\mathbb Z}[x]$$

of ${\mathbb Z}[x]$ is determined by the image under $F$ of the variable $x$, which we denote by

$$f=F(x)$$

and this image $f$ can be any element of ${\mathbb Z}[x]$. Therefore, one may consider the elements $f\in{\mathbb Z}[x]$ as endomorphisms and assign $\circ:{\mathbb Z}[x]\times{\mathbb Z}[x]\rightarrow{\mathbb Z}[x]$, accordingly. One easily verifies that ${\mathbb Z}[x]$ satisfies the above axioms. For example, one has

$$(x^2+3x+5)\circ(x-2)=(x-2)^2+3(x-2)+5=x^2-x+3.$$

This example is isomorphic to the given example for R[X] with R equal to $\mathbb Z$, and also to the subring of all functions $\mathbb Z\to\mathbb Z$ formed by the polynomial functions.

== See also ==
- Composition operator
- Polynomial decomposition
- Jabotinsky matrix
