= Carleman's equation =

In mathematics, Carleman's equation is a Fredholm integral equation of the first kind with a logarithmic kernel. Its solution was first given by Torsten Carleman in 1922. The equation is

$$\int_a^b \ln|x-t| \, y(t) \, dt = f(x)$$

The solution for b − a ≠ 4 is

$$y(x)
=
\frac{1}{\pi^2 \sqrt{(x-a)(b-x)}}
\left[
\int_a^b \frac{\sqrt{(t-a)(b-t)} f'_t(t) \, dt}{t-x}
+\frac{1}{\ln \left[ \frac{1}{4} (b-a) \right]} \int_a^b \frac{f(t) \, dt}{\sqrt{(t-a)(b-t)}}
\right]$$

If b − a = 4 then the equation is solvable only if the following condition is satisfied

$$\int_a^b \frac{f(t) \, dt}{\sqrt{(t-a)(b-t)}} = 0$$

In this case the solution has the form

$$y(x)
=
\frac{1}{\pi^2 \sqrt{(x-a)(b-x)}}
\left[
\int_a^b \frac{\sqrt{(t-a)(b-t)} f'_t(t) \, dt}{t-x}
+C
\right]$$

where C is an arbitrary constant.

For the special case f(t) = 1 (in which case it is necessary to have b − a ≠ 4), useful in some applications, we get

$$y(x)
=
\frac{1}{\pi \ln \left[ \frac{1}{4} (b-a) \right]} \frac{1}{\sqrt{(x-a)(b-x)}}$$
