= Subbaramiah Minakshisundaram =

Indian mathematician (1913–1968)

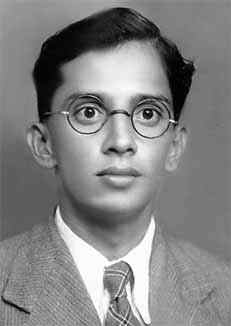
- Minakshisundaram in 1940
- Born: 12 October 1913; Trichur, Kerala State, India
- Died: 12 August 1968 (aged 54); Visakhapatnam, Andhra Pradesh, India
- Other names: Minakshi, SMS, Jeja
- Occupation: Mathematician
- Years active: 1936 - 1968
- Known for: Minakshisundaram-Pleijel zeta function

Subbaramiah Minakshisundaram (12 October 1913 - 13 August 1968), also known as Minakshi or SMS, was an Indian mathematician who worked on partial differential equations and heat kernels. In 1946, he worked at the Institute for Advanced Study in Princeton, America, where he met Åke Pleijel. In 1949, the two wrote a paper together called, Some properties of the eigenfunctions of the Laplace-operator on Riemannian manifolds, in which they introduced the Minakshisundaram-Pleijel zeta function.

On the 13th of August 1968, Subbaramiah suffered a heart attack and died at the age of 55.

== Biography ==
=== Early life ===
Subbaramiah Minakshisundaram was the first of three children, born in 1913 and called "Jeja" by his parents, meaning God. In his early years he learned Malayalam, but when his family moved to Chennai because of his father's job as a sanitary engineer they spoke Tamil.

His family were Hindus, and as a boy Minakshisundaram would chant the Gayatri Japa and perform the Sandhyavandanam with his grandfather every morning and night.

In 1919, Minakshi attended the Calavala Ramanujam Chetty High School, where he displayed a "marked aptitude" for mathematics, and graduated in 1929 with a Secondary School Leaving Certificate. After graduating, he studied at Pachaiyappa's College and went to Loyola College in 1931 to pursue a B.A. in mathematics, which he attained in 1934.

=== Career ===
After graduating from Loyola College, Subbaramiah joined the University of Madras as a research scholar and worked in the library.

During his time at the University of Madras, Minakshi was influenced by K Ananda Rau, and began studying the summability of series. His first paper, Tauberian theorems on Dirichlet's series, was published in 1936 and expanded upon Rau's theorem. He followed this with two papers, both published in 1937: On the extension of a theorem of Caratheodory in the theory of Fourier series, and, The Fourier series of a sequence of functions.

=== Marriage ===
On the 10th of May, 1937, Minakshisundaram married M Parvathi. They had three children together:

- K Ramu (born 1943)
- K Girija (born 1945)
- K Radha (birthdate unknown)

== Publications ==
- Minakshisundaram, S., & Szasz, O. (1947). On Absolute Convergence of Multiple Fourier Series. Transactions of the American Mathematical Society, 61(1), 36–53. https://doi.org/10.2307/1990288
- Minakshisundaram, S., & Pleijel, Å. (1949). Some Properties of the Eigenfunctions of The Laplace-Operator on Riemannian Manifolds. Canadian Journal of Mathematics, 1(3), 242-256. doi:10.4153/CJM-1949-021-5
- Minakshisundaram, S. (1949). A Generalization of Epstein Zeta Functions. Canadian Journal of Mathematics, 1(4), 320-327. doi:10.4153/CJM-1949-029-3
- Minakshisundaram, S., Chandrasekharan, K. (1952). Typical Means. India: Tata Institute of Fundamental Research, Bombay.
- Minakshisundaram, S. (1953). Eigenfunctions on Riemannian Manifolds. The Journal of the Indian Mathematical Society, 17(4), 159–165
- Chandrasekharan, K., & Minakshisundaram, S. (1954). A Note on Typical Means. The Journal of the Indian Mathematical Society, 18(1), 107–114

=== Posthumous works ===
- Minakshisundaram, S. (2012). Collected Works of S. Minakshisundaram. India: Ramanujan Mathematical Society.
