= Louis Shapiro =

Louis Shapiro may refer to:

- Louis Shapiro (communist)
- Louis Shapiro (judge)
- Louis Shapiro (mathematician)
