= Carleman's inequality =

Carleman's inequality is an inequality in mathematics, named after Torsten Carleman, who proved it in 1923 and used it to prove the Denjoy–Carleman theorem on quasi-analytic classes.

== Statement ==
Let $a_1,a_2,a_3,\dots$ be a sequence of non-negative real numbers, then

$$\sum_{n=1}^\infty \left(a_1 a_2 \cdots a_n\right)^{1/n} \le \mathrm{e} \sum_{n=1}^\infty a_n.$$

The constant $\mathrm{e}$ (euler number) in the inequality is optimal, that is, the inequality does not always hold if $\mathrm{e}$ is replaced by a smaller number. The inequality is strict (it holds with "<" instead of "≤") if some element in the sequence is non-zero.

== Integral version ==
Carleman's inequality has an integral version, which states that

$$\int_0^\infty \exp\left\{ \frac{1}{x} \int_0^x \ln f(t) \,\mathrm{d}t \right\} \,\mathrm{d}x \leq \mathrm{e} \int_0^\infty f(x) \,\mathrm{d}x$$

for any f ≥ 0.

== Carleson's inequality ==
A generalisation, due to Lennart Carleson, states the following:

for any convex function g with g(0) = 0, and for any -1 < p < ∞,

$$\int_0^\infty x^p \mathrm{e}^{-g(x)/x} \,\mathrm{d}x \leq \mathrm{e}^{p+1} \int_0^\infty x^p \mathrm{e}^{-g'(x)} \,\mathrm{d}x.$$

Carleman's inequality follows from the case p = 0.

== Proof ==
=== Direct proof ===
An elementary proof is sketched below. From the inequality of arithmetic and geometric means applied to the numbers $1\cdot a_1,2\cdot a_2,\dots,n \cdot a_n$

$$\mathrm{MG}(a_1,\dots,a_n)=\mathrm{MG}(1a_1,2a_2,\dots,na_n)(n!)^{-1/n}\le \mathrm{MA}(1a_1,2a_2,\dots,na_n)(n!)^{-1/n}$$

where MG stands for geometric mean, and MA — for arithmetic mean. The Stirling-type inequality $n!\ge \sqrt{2\pi n}\, n^n \mathrm{e}^{-n}$ applied to $n+1$ implies

$(n!)^{-1/n} \le \frac{\mathrm{e}}{n+1}$ for all $n\ge1.$

Therefore,

$$MG(a_1,\dots,a_n) \le \frac{\mathrm{e}}{n(n+1)}\,  \sum_{1\le k \le n}   k a_k   \, ,$$

whence

$$\sum_{n\ge1}MG(a_1,\dots,a_n) \le\,  \mathrm{e}\, \sum_{k\ge1} \bigg( \sum_{n\ge k}  \frac{1}{n(n+1)}\bigg) \, k a_k =\, \mathrm{e}\, \sum_{k\ge1}\,  a_k  \,  ,$$

proving the inequality. Moreover, the inequality of arithmetic and geometric means of $n$ non-negative numbers is known to be an equality if and only if all the numbers coincide, that is, in the present case, if and only if $a_k= C/k$ for $k=1,\dots,n$. As a consequence, Carleman's inequality is never an equality for a convergent series, unless all $a_n$ vanish, just because the harmonic series is divergent.

=== By Hardy’s inequality ===
One can also prove Carleman's inequality by starting with Hardy's inequality

$$\sum_{n=1}^\infty \left (\frac{a_1+a_2+\cdots +a_n}{n}\right )^p\le \left (\frac{p}{p-1}\right )^p\sum_{n=1}^\infty a_n^p$$

for the non-negative numbers $a_1$, $a_2$,… and $p > 1$, replacing each $a_n$ with $a_n^{1/p}$, and letting $p \to \infty$.

== Versions for specific sequences ==
Christian Axler and Mehdi Hassani investigated Carleman's inequality for the specific cases of $a_i= p_i$ where $p_i$ is the $i$th prime number. They also investigated the case where $a_i=\frac{1}{p_i}$. They found that if $a_i=p_i$ one can replace $e$ with $\frac{1}{e}$ in Carleman's inequality, but that if $a_i=\frac{1}{p_i}$ then $e$ remained the best possible constant.
