= Hardy's inequality =

Inequality in mathematics

Hardy's inequality is an inequality in mathematics, named after G. H. Hardy.

Its discrete version states that if $a_1, a_2, a_3, \dots$ is a sequence of non-negative real numbers, then for every real number p > 1 one has

$$\sum_{n=1}^\infty \left (\frac{a_1+a_2+\cdots +a_n}{n}\right )^p\leq\left (\frac{p}{p-1}\right )^p\sum_{n=1}^\infty a_n^p.$$

If the right-hand side is finite, equality holds if and only if $a_n = 0$ for all n.

An integral version of Hardy's inequality states the following: if f is a measurable function with non-negative values, then

$$\int_0^\infty \left (\frac{1}{x}\int_0^x f(t)\, dt\right)^p\, dx\le\left (\frac{p}{p-1}\right )^p\int_0^\infty f(x)^p\, dx.$$

If the right-hand side is finite, equality holds if and only if f(x) = 0 almost everywhere.

Hardy's inequality was first published and proved (at least the discrete version with a worse constant) in 1920 in a note by Hardy. The original formulation was in an integral form slightly different from the above.

== Statements ==
=== General discrete Hardy inequality ===
The general weighted one dimensional version reads as follows: if $a_n \ge 0$, $\lambda_n>0$ and $p > 1$,

$$\sum_{n = 1}^\infty \lambda_n
\Bigl(
\frac{\lambda_1 a_1 + \dotsb + \lambda_n a_n}{\lambda_1 + \dotsb + \lambda_n}
\Bigr)^p
\le \Bigl(\frac{p}{p - 1} \Bigr)^p \sum_{n = 1}^\infty \lambda_n a_n^p.$$

=== General one-dimensional integral Hardy inequality ===
The general weighted one dimensional version reads as follows:

- If $\alpha + \tfrac{1}{p} < 1$, then

$$\int_0^\infty \biggl(y^{\alpha - 1} \int_0^y x^{-\alpha} f(x)\,dx \biggr)^p \,dy \le
\frac{1}{\bigl(1 - \alpha - \frac{1}{p}\bigr)^p} \int_0^\infty f(x)^p\, dx$$

- If $\alpha + \tfrac{1}{p} > 1$, then

$$\int_0^\infty \biggl(y^{\alpha - 1} \int_y^\infty x^{-\alpha} f(x)\,dx \biggr)^p\,dy \le
\frac{1}{\bigl(\alpha + \frac{1}{p} - 1\bigr)^p} \int_0^\infty f(x)^p\, dx.$$

The more general case is weighted integral Hardy inequality

=== Weighted one-dimensional integral Hardy inequality ===
The statement is following: if $1 < p \leq q < \infty$ inequality

$$\left( \int_{a}^{b}{\left( \int_a^x{f(t)}dt \right)^q u(x)}dx \right)^{1/q} \leq C \left( \int_{a}^{b} {f^p(x) v(x)} dx \right)^{1/p}$$

holds for $-\infty \leq a < b \leq \infty$ with $u, v$ measurable, positive on $(a, b)$ and also $f(x) \geq 0$ any measurable on $(a, b)$, if and only if

$$A = \sup_{x \in (a, b)}{\left( \int_{x}^{b} u(t)dt \right)^{1/q} \left( \int_{a}^{x} v^{1-p'}(t) dt \right)^{1/p'}} < \infty$$

And if $1 < q < p < \infty$ inequality also holds if and only if

$$A = \left( \int_{a}^{b}{{\left( \int_{x}^{b} u(t)dt \right)^{r/q} \left( \int_{a}^{x} v^{1-p'}(t) dt \right)^{r/q'}}v^{1-p'}(x) dx} \right)^{1/r} < \infty$$

where $\frac{1}{r} = \frac{1}{q} - \frac{1}{p}, \frac{1}{p} + \frac{1}{p'} = 1$ and $\frac{1}{q} + \frac{1}{q'} = 1$

=== Multidimensional Hardy inequalities with gradient ===
==== Multidimensional Hardy inequality around a point ====
In the multidimensional case, Hardy's inequality can be extended to $L^{p}$-spaces, taking the form

$$\left\|\frac{f}{|\cdot|}\right\|_{L^{p}(\mathbb{R}^{n})}\le \frac{p}{n-p}\|\nabla f\|_{L^{p}(\mathbb{R}^{n})}, 2\le n, 1\le p<n,$$

where $f\in C_{c}^{\infty}(\mathbb{R}^{n})$, and where the constant $\frac{p}{n-p}$ is known to be sharp; by density it extends then to the Sobolev space $W^{1, p} (\mathbb{R}^n)$.

Similarly, if $p > n \ge 2$, then one has for every $f\in C_{c}^{\infty}(\mathbb{R}^{n})$

$$\Big(1 - \frac{n}{p}\Big)^p  \int_{\mathbb{R}^n} \frac{\vert f(x) - f (0)\vert^p}{|x|^p} dx
\le \int_{\mathbb{R}^n} \vert \nabla f\vert^p.$$

==== Multidimensional Hardy inequality near the boundary ====
If $\Omega \subsetneq \mathbb{R}^n$ is an nonempty convex open set, then for $1<p<\infty$ and every $f \in W_0^{1, p} (\Omega)$,

$$\Big(1 - \frac{1}{p}\Big)^p\int_{\Omega} \frac{\vert f (x)\vert^p}{\operatorname{dist} (x, \partial \Omega)^p}\,dx
\le \int_{\Omega}\vert \nabla f \vert^p,$$

and the constant cannot be improved.

=== Fractional Hardy inequality ===
If $1 \le p < \infty$ and $0 < \lambda < \infty$, $\lambda \ne 1$, there exists a constant $C$ such that for every $f : (0, \infty) \to \mathbb{R}$ satisfying $\int_0^\infty \vert f (x)\vert^p/x^{\lambda} \,dx < \infty$, one has

$$\int_0^\infty \frac{\vert f (x)\vert^p}{x^{\lambda}} \,dx
\le C \int_0^\infty \int_0^\infty \frac{\vert f (x) - f (y)\vert^p}{\vert x - y\vert^{1+\lambda}} \,dx \, dy.$$

== Proof of the inequality ==
=== Integral version (integration by parts and Hölder) ===
Hardy’s original proof begins with an integration by parts to get

$$\begin{align}
\int_0^\infty \left(\frac{1}{x} \int_0^x f(t)\, dt \right)^p dx
&= \int_0^\infty \left(\int_0^x f(t)\, dt \right)^p \frac{1}{x^p} dx
\\[0.2em]
&= \frac{p}{p - 1} \int_0^\infty
\left(\int_0^x f(t)\, dt \right)^{p - 1} \frac{f (x)}{x^{p - 1}} dx \\[0.2em]
&= \frac{p}{p - 1} \int_0^\infty
\left(\frac{1}{x}\int_0^x f(t)\, dt \right)^{p - 1} f (x) dx
\end{align}$$

Then, by Hölder's inequality,

$$\int_0^\infty \left(\frac{1}{x} \int_0^x f(t)\, dt \right)^p dx
\le \frac{p}{p - 1} \left( \int_0^\infty \left(\frac{1}{x} \int_0^x f(t)\, dt \right)^p dx \right)^{1 - \frac{1}{p}}
\left( \int_0^\infty f (x)^p \, dx \right)^\frac{1}{p},$$

and the conclusion follows.

=== Integral version (scaling and Minkowski) ===
A change of variables gives

$$\left(\int_0^\infty\left(\frac{1}{x}\int_0^x f(t)\,dt\right)^p\ dx\right)^{1/p}=\left(\int_0^\infty\left(\int_0^1 f(sx)\,ds\right)^p\,dx\right)^{1/p},$$

which is less or equal than $\int_0^1\left(\int_0^\infty f(sx)^p\,dx\right)^{1/p}\,ds$ by Minkowski's integral inequality. Finally, by another change of variables, the last expression equals

$$\int_0^1\left(\int_0^\infty f(x)^p\,dx\right)^{1/p}s^{-1/p}\,ds=\frac{p}{p-1}\left(\int_0^\infty f(x)^p\,dx\right)^{1/p}.$$

=== Discrete version: from the continuous version ===
Assuming the right-hand side to be finite, we must have $a_n\to 0$ as $n\to\infty$. Hence, for any positive integer j, there are only finitely many terms bigger than $2^{-j}$. This allows us to construct a decreasing sequence $b_1\ge b_2\ge\dotsb$ containing the same positive terms as the original sequence (but possibly no zero terms). Since $a_1+a_2+\dotsb +a_n\le b_1+b_2+\dotsb +b_n$ for every n, it suffices to show the inequality for the new sequence. This follows directly from the integral form, defining $f(x)=b_n$ if $n-1<x<n$ and $f(x)=0$ otherwise. Indeed, one has

$$\int_0^\infty f(x)^p\,dx=\sum_{n=1}^\infty b_n^p$$

and, for $n-1<x<n$, there holds

$$\frac{1}{x}\int_0^x f(t)\,dt=\frac{b_1+\dots+b_{n-1}+(x-n+1)b_n}{x} \ge \frac{b_1+\dots+b_n}{n}$$

(the last inequality is equivalent to $(n-x)(b_1+\dots+b_{n-1})\ge (n-1)(n-x)b_n$, which is true as the new sequence is decreasing) and thus

$$\sum_{n=1}^\infty\left(\frac{b_1+\dots+b_n}{n}\right)^p\le\int_0^\infty\left(\frac{1}{x}\int_0^x f(t)\,dt\right)^p\,dx$$.

=== Discrete version: Direct proof ===
Let $p > 1$ and let $b_1 , \dots , b_n$ be positive real numbers. Set $S_k = \sum_{i=1}^k b_i$. First we prove the inequality

$\sum_{n=1}^N \frac{S_n^p}{n^p} \leq \frac{p}{p-1} \sum_{n=1}^N \frac{b_n S_n^{p-1}}{n^{p-1}},$	*

Let $T_n = \frac{S_n}{n}$ and let $\Delta_n$ be the difference between the $n$-th terms in the right-hand side and left-hand side of *, that is, $\Delta_n := T_n^p - \frac{p}{p-1} b_n T_n^{p-1}$. We have:

$$\Delta_n = T_n^p - \frac{p}{p-1} b_n T_n^{p-1} = T_n^p - \frac{p}{p-1} (n T_n - (n-1) T_{n-1}) T_n^{p-1}$$

or

$$\Delta_n = T_n^p \left( 1 - \frac{np}{p-1} \right) + \frac{p (n-1)}{p-1} T_{n-1} T_n^p  .$$

According to Young's inequality we have:

$$T_{n-1} T_n^{p-1} \leq \frac{T_{n-1}^p}{p} + (p-1) \frac{T_n^p}{p}  ,$$

from which it follows that:

$$\Delta_n \leq \frac{n-1}{p-1} T_{n-1}^p - \frac{n}{p-1} T_n^p  .$$

By telescoping we have:

$$\begin{align}
\sum_{n=1}^N \Delta_n &\leq 0 - \frac{1}{p-1} T_1^p + \frac{1}{p-1} T_1^p
- \frac{2}{p-1} T_2^p + \frac{2}{p-1} T_2^p - \\
& \qquad - \frac{3}{p-1} T_3^p + \dotsb
+ \frac{N-1}{p-1} T_{N-1}^p - \frac{N}{p-1} T_N^p \\
& \qquad = - \frac{N}{p-1} T_N^p < 0
\end{align}$$

proving *. Applying Hölder's inequality to the right-hand side of * we have:

$$\sum_{n=1}^N \frac{S_n^p}{n^p} \leq \frac{p}{p-1} \sum_{n=1}^N \frac{b_n S_n^{p-1}}{n^{p-1}} \leq \frac{p}{p-1} \left( \sum_{n=1}^N b_n^p \right)^{1/p} \left( \sum_{n=1}^N \frac{S_n^p}{n^p} \right)^{(p-1)/p}$$

from which we immediately obtain:

$$\sum_{n=1}^N \frac{S_n^p}{n^p} \leq \left( \frac{p}{p-1} \right)^p \sum_{n=1}^N b_n^p  .$$

Letting $N \rightarrow \infty$ we obtain Hardy's inequality.

== See also ==
- Carleman's inequality
