= John Riordan (mathematician) =

American mathematician

- Born: April 22, 1903; Derby, Connecticut, United States
- Died: August 27, 1988 (aged 85); Scituate, Massachusetts, United States
- Education: Yale University
- Occupation: Mathematician
- Years active: 1926–1968
- Spouse: Mavis McIntosh

John Francis Riordan (April 22, 1903 – August 27, 1988) was an American mathematician and the author of major early works in combinatorics, particularly Introduction to Combinatorial Analysis and Combinatorial Identities.

== Biography ==
Riordan was a graduate of Yale University. In his early life he wrote a number of poems and essays and a book of short-stories, On the Make, published in 1929, and was Editor-in-Chief of Salient and The Figure in the Carpet, literary magazines published by The New School for Social Research in New York. He married Mavis McIntosh, the well-known poet and literary agent and founder of McIntosh & Otis. The couple had two daughters: Sheila Riordan and Kathleen Riordan Speeth, and were long time residents of Hastings-on-Hudson, New York.

Riordan's long professional career was at Bell Labs, which he joined in 1926 (a year after its foundation) and where he remained, publishing over a hundred scholarly papers on combinatorial analysis, until he retired in 1968. He then joined the faculty at Rockefeller University as professor emeritus. A Festschrift was published in his honor in 1978.

Throughout his life Riordan led an active literary life, with many distinguished friends such as Kenneth Burke, William Carlos Williams, and A. R. Orage.

The Riordan array, introduced by mathematician Louis W. Shapiro, is named after John Riordan. The Riordan number was also named after him in 1999.

== Tribute ==
From the Introduction by Marc Kac to the Special Issue of the JCTA in honor of John Riordan:

Foremost among the keepers of the barely flickering combinatorial flame was John Riordan. John’s work in Combinatorial Theory (or Combinatorial Analysis as he prefers to call it) is uncompromisingly classical in spirit and appearance. Though largely tolerant of modernity he does not let anyone forget that Combinatorial Analysis is the art and science of counting (enumerating is the word he prefers) and that a generating function by any other name or definition is still a generating function.

From an interview with Neil Sloane published by Bell Labs:

"Even at the end of my first year as a graduate student at Cornell, in 1962, I managed to arrange a summer job at Bell Labs in Holmdel. This was still on minimal cost networks. During that summer I met another of my heroes, John Riordan, one of the great early workers in combinatorics. His book An Introduction to Combinatorial Analysis is a classic. He was working at Bell Labs in West Street in Manhattan at that time. One of my earliest papers, on a problem that came up in my thesis work, was a joint paper with him."

== Selected publications ==
- Riordan, John (1929). On the Make. Farrar & Rinehart. OCLC 7532863. (book of 14 short-stories)
- Carlitz, Leonard; Riordan, John (1956). "The number of labeled two-terminal series-parallel networks". Duke Mathematical Journal. 23 (3): 435–445. doi:10.1215/S0012-7094-56-02340-7.
- Riordan, John (1958). Introduction to Combinatorial Analysis. Princeton University Press. ISBN 978-0-691-02365-6. (reissued in 1980; reprinted again in 2002 by Courier Dover Publications) translated into Russian in 1962.
- Riordan, John (1962). Stochastic Service Systems. John Wiley & Sons. LCCN 62008785.
- Riordan, John (1968). Combinatorial Identities. John Wiley & Sons. LCCN 67031375. MR 0231725. OCLC 681863847. (reprinted with corrections: Riordan, John (1979). Combinatorial Identities. R.E. Krieger Pub. Co. ISBN 978-0-88275-829-9.)
