= Minakshisundaram–Pleijel zeta function =

The Minakshisundaram–Pleijel zeta function is a zeta function encoding the eigenvalues of the Laplacian of a compact Riemannian manifold. It was introduced by Subbaramiah Minakshisundaram and Åke Pleijel (1949). The case of a compact region of the plane was treated earlier by Torsten Carleman (1935).

== Definition ==
For a compact Riemannian manifold M of dimension N with eigenvalues $\lambda_1, \lambda_2, \ldots$ of the Laplace–Beltrami operator $\Delta$, the zeta function is given for $\operatorname{Re}(s)$ sufficiently large by

$$Z(s) = \mbox{Tr}(\Delta^{-s}) = \sum_{n=1}^{\infty} \vert \lambda_{n} \vert^{-s}.$$

(where if an eigenvalue is zero it is omitted in the sum). The manifold may have a boundary, in which case one has to prescribe suitable boundary conditions, such as Dirichlet or Neumann boundary conditions.

More generally one can define

$$Z(P, Q, s) = \sum_{n=1}^{\infty} \frac{f_n(P)f_n(Q)}{ \lambda_{n}^s}$$

for P and Q on the manifold, where the $f_n$ are normalized eigenfunctions. This can be analytically continued to a meromorphic function of s for all complex s, and is holomorphic for $P\ne Q$.

The only possible poles are simple poles at the points $s = N/2, N/2-1, N/2-2,\dots, 1/2,-1/2, -3/2,\dots$ for N odd, and at the points $s = N/2, N/2-1, N/2-2, \dots,2, 1$ for N even. If N is odd then $Z(P,P,s)$ vanishes at $s= 0, -1, -2,\dots$. If N is even, the residues at the poles can be explicitly found in terms of the metric, and by the Wiener–Ikehara theorem we find as a corollary the relation

$$\sum_{\lambda_n < T} f_n(P)^2 \sim\frac{T^{N/2}}{(2\sqrt{\pi})^N\Gamma(N/2+1)}$$,

where the symbol $\sim$ indicates that the quotient of both the sides tend to 1 when T tends to $+\infty$.

The function $Z(s)$ can be recovered from $Z(P,P,s)$ by integrating over the whole manifold M:

$$\displaystyle Z(s) = \int_M Z(P,P,s)dP$$.

== Heat kernel ==
The analytic continuation of the zeta function can be found by expressing it in terms of the heat kernel

$$K(P,Q,t) = \sum_{n=1}^{\infty} f_n(P)f_n(Q) e^{- \lambda_{n}t}$$

as the Mellin transform

$$Z(P,Q,s) = \frac{1}{\Gamma(s)} \int_0^\infty K(P,Q,t) t^{s-1} dt$$

In particular, we have

$$Z(s) = \frac{1}{\Gamma(s)} \int_0^\infty K(t) t^{s-1} dt$$

where

$$K(t)=\int_M K(P,P,t)dP=\sum^\infty_{i=1}e^{-\lambda_i t}$$

is the trace of the heat kernel.

The poles of the zeta function can be found from the asymptotic behavior of the heat kernel as t→0.

== Example ==
If the manifold is a circle of dimension N=1, then the eigenvalues of the Laplacian are n^{2} for integers n. The zeta function

$$Z(s) = \sum_{n\ne 0}\frac{1}{(n^2)^s} = 2\zeta(2s)$$

where ζ is the Riemann zeta function.

== Applications ==
Apply the method of heat kernel to asymptotic expansion for Riemannian manifold (M,g) we obtain the two following theorems. Both are the resolutions of the inverse problem in which we get the geometric properties or quantities from spectra of the operators.

1. Minakshisundaram–Pleijel Asymptotic Expansion Let (M,g) be an n-dimensional Riemannian manifold. Then, as t→0+, the trace of the heat kernel has an asymptotic expansion of the form:
  $$K(t)\sim(4\pi t)^{-n/2}\sum^\infty_{m=0}a_m t^m.$$
  In dim=2, this means that the integral of scalar curvature tells us the Euler characteristic of M, by the Gauss–Bonnet theorem. In particular,
  $$a_0=\operatorname{Vol}(M,g),\ \ \ \ a_1=\frac{1}{6}\int_MS(x)dV$$
  where S(x) is scalar curvature, the trace of the Ricci curvature, on M.
2. Weyl Asymptotic Formula Let M be a compact Riemannian manifold, with eigenvalues $0=\lambda_0\le\lambda_1\le\lambda_2\cdots,$ with each distinct eigenvalue repeated with its multiplicity. Define N(λ) to be the number of eigenvalues less than or equal to $\lambda$, and let $\omega_n$ denote the volume of the unit disk in $\R^n$. Then
  $$N(\lambda)\sim\frac{\omega_n \operatorname{Vol}(M)\lambda^{n/2}}{(2\pi)^n},$$
  as $\lambda \to \infty$. Additionally, as $k \to \infty$,
  $$(\lambda_k)^{n/2}\sim\frac{(2\pi)^nk}{\omega_n \operatorname{Vol}(M)}.$$
  This is also called Weyl's law, refined from the Minakshisundaram–Pleijel asymptotic expansion.
