= Nils Holmgren =

Swedish zoologist (1877–1954)

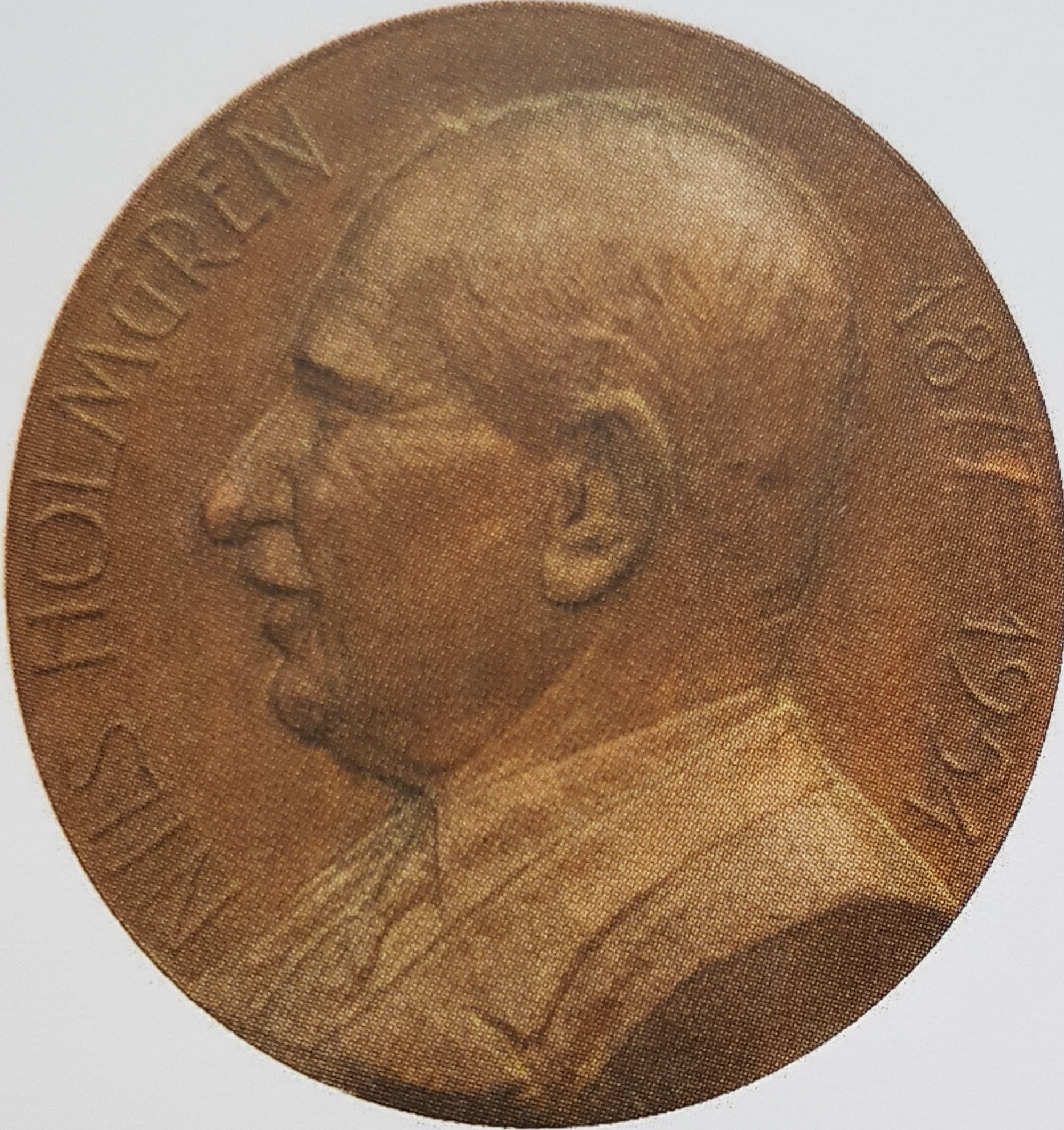
- Born: 28 September 1877; Adolf Fredriks parish
- Died: 7 September 1954 (aged 76); Johannes parish
- Resting place: Norra begravningsplatsen
- Occupation: Zoologist
- Employer: Stockholm University
- Relatives: Erik Albert Holmgren, Anders Holmgren

Swedish expedition 1904–1905 to the border area of Peru and Bolivia. Erland Nordenskiöld and Nils Holmgren in the front row.

Nils Frithiof Holmgren (September 28, 1877 – September 7, 1954) was a Swedish zoologist and comparative anatomist. He was professor of zoology at Stockholm University from 1921 to 1944. He took a special interest in the taxonomy of termites.

Holmgren went to the Stockholm University College and in 1906 he defended his doctoral dissertation at the newly created Stockholm University. In 1912 he became a teacher at the zoological institute, and in 1919 assistant professor of zoology (replacing Wilhelm Leche), and in 1921 full professor. His early work focussed on the biology, systematics and anatomy of insects, especially termites, as in Studien über südamerikanische Termiten (1906) and Termitenstudien (1909–1912). In later work he focused on the structure of the brain in worms, arthropods and vertebrates, publishing Vergleichende Anatomie des Gehirns (1916) (Comparative anatomy of the brain), Zur Anatomie des Gehirns von Myxine (1919), Zur Anatomie und Histologie des Vorder- und Zwischenhirns der Knochenfiske (1920), Points of view concerning forebrain morphology in lower vertebrates (1922), (with C. J. van der Horst) Contribution to the morphology of the brain in Ceratodus (1925), and Points of view concerning forebrain morphology in higher vertebrates (1925). This work made him a world expert on the nervous systems of the lower vertebrates. Later work focused on the investigation of cartilage in lower vertebrates. Holmgren, who undertook a research trip to Bolivia and Peru in 1904–1905, was from 1920 the publisher of the journal Acta Zoologica. Holmgren was elected a member of the Royal Swedish Academy of Sciences in 1928.
