= Hilbert–Carleman determinant =

In functional analysis, the Hilbert–Carleman determinant is an operator determinant for certain integral operators on Banach spaces, whose kernels are not necessarily continuous. Unlike Fredholm determinant which is generally not defined for integral operators whose kernels are discontinuous on the diagonal, the Hilbert–Carleman determinant can be defined even when this condition fails. Similarly to the Fredholm determinant, the Hilbert–Carleman determinant is defined for sums of the form $I+A$ where $I$ is the identity operator and $A$ is an integral operator.

The Hilbert–Carleman determinant is named after David Hilbert and Torsten Carleman.

== Hilbert–Carleman Determinant ==
Let $T \subseteq \mathbb{R}$ and let $B := L^p(T,\Sigma,\mu)$ be the L^p space over a measure space $(T,\Sigma,\mu)$ with Lebesgue measure $\mu$, where $1 \leq p < \infty$. Consider the integral operator

$$Af = \int_T k(t,s) f(s)\, \mathrm{d}\mu(s)$$

acting on the Banach space $B$ and let $I$ denote the identity operator. Then the Hilbert–Carleman determinant of $I + A$ is defined by

$$\operatorname{Det}(I + A) = 1 + \sum\limits_{n=2}^{\infty} \frac{1}{n!} \psi_n(A),$$

where

$$\psi_n(A) = \int_{T^n} \operatorname{det} \begin{pmatrix} 0 & k(t_1,t_2) & \cdots & k(t_1,t_n) \\ k(t_2,t_1) & 0 & \cdots & k(t_2,t_n) \\ \vdots & \vdots & \ddots & \vdots \\ k(t_n,t_1) & k(t_n,t_2) & \cdots & 0 \end{pmatrix} \prod\limits_{i=1}^{n} \mathrm{d}\mu(t_i).$$

=== Remarks ===
- The matrix in the definition contains zeros on the diagonal and kernel values $k(t_i,t_j)$ elsewhere.
- Unlike the Fredholm determinant, the Hilbert–Carleman determinant is not multiplicative.
- If $A$ is a trace class operator, then the Hilbert–Carleman determinant is related to the Fredholm determinant $\operatorname{det}(I + A)$ by

$$\operatorname{Det}(I + A) = \operatorname{det}(I + A)\exp(-\operatorname{tr}(A)).$$

== Bibliography ==
- Gohberg, Israel; Goldberg, Seymour; Krupnik, Nahum (2000). Traces and Determinants of Linear Operators. Operator Theory: Advances and Applications. Vol. 116. Birkhäuser. ISBN 978-3-7643-6177-8.
