= Riordan number =

Natural number of set partitions

A Riordan number is a natural number of set partitions of n points placed on a circle such that every set block contains at least two points and the convex hulls of distinct blocks are disjoint. They are denoted as $R_n$. These was first documented by Frank R. Bernhart in 1999, who named it after mathematician John Riordan. It appears often in enumeration problems. It is related to Catalan numbers and Motzkin numbers.

Riordan numbers are also known as Motzkin summands or ring numbers.

The first few Riordan numbers are:

1, 0, 1, 1, 3, 6, 15, 36, 91, 232, 603, 1585, 4213, 11298, 30537, 83097, 227475, 625992, 1730787, 4805595, 13393689, ... (sequence A005043 in the OEIS)

== Generating function ==
The generating function for Riordan numbers is:

$R \ (x)$	$=\sum_{n=0}^{\infty} R_n \ x^n$
	$=\frac{1}{2x}\left (1-\sqrt{\frac{1-3x}{1+x}} \right)$
	$=1+x^2+x^3+3 \ x^4+6 \ x^5+15 \ x^6+...$
	$=\frac{1+x-\sqrt{1-2x-3x^2}}{2x(1+x)}$

which follow the functional equation

$R \ (x)=\frac{1}{1+x}+x \ R \ (x)^2.$
