= Carleman linearization =

Linearization technique for nonlinear differential systems

In mathematics, Carleman linearization (also called Carleman embedding) is a method that formally represents a finite-dimensional nonlinear system of ordinary differential equations as an infinite-dimensional linear system. Truncating the resulting hierarchy at a finite order yields approximate solutions of the original nonlinear system, known as Carleman approximants.

The method was introduced by the Swedish mathematician Torsten Carleman in 1932. For polynomial systems, the construction successively introduces monomials of the state variables as new dependent variables. More generally, the additional variables may be chosen according to the nonlinear structure of the differential system. Carleman linearization may be regarded as a systematic extension of the usual local linearization of nonlinear differential equations, in which higher-order nonlinear terms are retained through an enlargement of the phase space.

Carleman linearization is related to composition operators, particularly the Koopman operator, which represents nonlinear dynamics through linear evolution on a space of observable functions. It has been applied in nonlinear control theory, state estimation, chemical kinetics, process modelling, mathematical biology, and the construction of finite-dimensional approximations to Koopman operators. The method has also been used in the development of quantum algorithms for nonlinear differential equations.

== Method ==
Consider an autonomous system of ordinary differential equations,

$$\frac{d\mathbf{x}}{dt}=\mathbf{f}(\mathbf{x}),
\qquad
\mathbf{x}(0)=\mathbf{c},
\qquad
\mathbf{x}\in\mathbb{R}^{p}.$$

Carleman linearization consists of replacing nonlinear terms appearing on the right-hand side of the system with new dependent variables. Differentiating these variables generally produces further nonlinear terms, which are treated successively in the same way. The procedure therefore generates an infinite sequence of linear differential equations. A finite-dimensional approximation is obtained when the sequence is terminated according to a chosen truncation criterion. The solution of the truncated linear system is called a Carleman approximant.

For polynomial systems, the additional variables are monomials of the original state variables. The order $N$ of the approximation is then defined as the degree of the highest-order monomial retained. Other sets of dependent variables may be chosen when they are better adapted to the structure of the differential system.

After truncation at order $N$, the original $p$-dimensional nonlinear system is replaced by a finite-dimensional linear system of dimension $m\geq p$. The value of $m$ depends on the approximation order and on the nonlinear structure of the original equations. The approximation to the original solution is given by the components of the enlarged linear system corresponding to the original state variables.

Two forms of the construction can be distinguished according to the point in phase space around which the Carleman approximant is built: linearization around an equilibrium point, referred to as Type A, and linearization around the initial condition, referred to as Type B.

=== Type A: linearization around an equilibrium point ===
Let $\mathbf{q}$ be an equilibrium point of the nonlinear system,

$$\mathbf{f}(\mathbf{q})=\mathbf{0}.$$

Introducing the shifted variable

$$\mathbf{y}=\mathbf{x}-\mathbf{q}$$

places the equilibrium point at the origin. Since the constant term of the transformed differential system vanishes, truncation of the Carleman sequence produces a homogeneous linear system with constant coefficients,

$$\frac{d\mathbf{X}_N}{dt}=M_N\mathbf{X}_N,$$

where $\mathbf{X}_N$ contains the retained variables and $M_N$ is the corresponding $m\times m$ coefficient matrix. Its solution is

$$\mathbf{X}_N(t)=e^{M_Nt}\mathbf{X}_N(0).$$

The approximate solution of the original nonlinear system is provided by the $p$ components of $\mathbf{X}_N(t)$ associated with the original variables, after reversing the coordinate shift.

The first-order Type A approximant coincides with the usual local linearization obtained from the Jacobian matrix of $\mathbf{f}$ at the equilibrium point. Higher-order approximants include additional nonlinear terms and may therefore be regarded as an extension of the local or qualitative analysis of nonlinear differential systems. For a fixed approximation order, their accuracy generally depends on the distance between the trajectory of interest and the equilibrium point around which the approximant was constructed.

=== Type B: linearization around the initial condition ===
Alternatively, the Carleman approximant may be constructed around the initial condition itself. Introducing

$$\mathbf{y}=\mathbf{x}-\mathbf{c},
\qquad
\mathbf{y}(0)=\mathbf{0},$$

gives

$$\frac{d\mathbf{y}}{dt}
=
\mathbf{f}(\mathbf{c}+\mathbf{y}).$$

Unless $\mathbf{c}$ is an equilibrium point, the transformed system contains the nonzero constant term $\mathbf{f}(\mathbf{c})$. Consequently, truncation of the Carleman sequence produces a non-homogeneous linear system,

$$\frac{d\mathbf{Y}_N}{dt}
=
M_N\mathbf{Y}_N+\mathbf{z}_N,
\qquad
\mathbf{Y}_N(0)=\mathbf{0},$$

where $\mathbf{z}_N$ is a constant vector determined by the initial condition and by the nonlinear differential system. The solution can be written as

$$\mathbf{Y}_N(t)
=
\int_0^t e^{M_N(t-s)}\mathbf{z}_N\,ds.$$

If $M_N$ is invertible, this becomes

$$\mathbf{Y}_N(t)
=
M_N^{-1}\left(e^{M_Nt}-I\right)\mathbf{z}_N.$$

The approximation to $\mathbf{x}(t)$ is obtained by adding $\mathbf{c}$ to the components of $\mathbf{Y}_N(t)$ associated with the shifted original variables.

Type B approximants require the solution of a non-homogeneous linear system and generally involve a greater algebraic burden than Type A approximants. However, centring the approximation at the initial condition can substantially improve its local accuracy.

=== Local accuracy ===
Comparison of the derivatives at $t=0$ of the exact solution and the Carleman approximants reveals different local-accuracy patterns. In the one- and two-dimensional systems analysed, an approximant of order $N$ reproduces the derivatives of the exact solution from order $0$ through order $N-1$, independently of the point around which it is constructed.

In one dimension, let $q$ be the point around which the approximant $\widetilde{x}(t)$ is constructed, and let $c=x(0)$ be the initial condition. The differences between the derivatives of the exact and approximate solutions have the following pattern:

Difference between the derivatives at $t=0$ of the exact solution and an order-$N$ Carleman approximant in one dimension. The coefficients $\alpha_k$ depend on the differential system.
| Order $k$ | $x^{(k)}(0)-\widetilde{x}^{(k)}(0)$ |
|---|---|
| $0,\ldots,N-1$ | $0$ |
| $N,\ldots,2N$ | $\alpha_k(c-q)^{2N-k+1}$ |

When the approximant is centred at the initial condition, $q=c$, the differences in the second row also vanish. Thus, for the one-dimensional systems considered, a Type B approximant reproduces the derivatives of the exact solution through order $2N$.

In two dimensions, let the approximants $\widetilde{x}_1(t)$ and $\widetilde{x}_2(t)$ be constructed around $(q_1,q_2)$, and let $(c_1,c_2)$ be the initial condition. For $i=1,2$, the corresponding pattern is

Difference between the derivatives at $t=0$ of the exact solution and an order-$N$ Carleman approximant in two dimensions. The coefficients $\alpha_{i,k}$ and $\beta_{i,k}$ depend on the differential system.
| Order $k$ | $x_i^{(k)}(0)-\widetilde{x}_i^{(k)}(0)$, with $i=1,2$ |
|---|---|
| $0,\ldots,N-1$ | $0$ |
| $N$ | $(c_1-q_1)(c_2-q_2) \left[ \alpha_{i,k}(c_1-q_1)^{N-1} + \beta_{i,k}(c_2-q_2)^{N-1} \right]$ |
| $N+1,\ldots,2N$ | $\alpha_{i,k}(c_1-q_1)^{2N-k+1} + \beta_{i,k}(c_2-q_2)^{2N-k+1}$ |

When $(q_1,q_2)=(c_1,c_2)$, all the displayed differences vanish. The additional agreement of the derivatives from order $N$ through order $2N$ accounts for the greater local accuracy observed for Type B approximants of a given order.

== Examples ==
The following examples illustrate the construction of Type A and Type B Carleman approximants in one and two dimensions. Only one equilibrium point is considered in each Type A construction.

=== One-dimensional example: Riccati equation ===
Consider the Riccati equation

$$\dot{u}=-u+u^2,
\qquad
u(0)=c.$$

Its exact solution is

$$u(t)=\frac{c}{c+(1-c)e^t}.$$

The equation has two equilibrium points, $u=0$ and $u=1$. The Type A approximant below is constructed only around $u=0$.

==== Type A approximant ====
Introduce the Carleman variables

$$u_k(t)=u^k(t),
\qquad
k=1,2,\ldots .$$

Differentiation gives the infinite linear sequence

$$\dot{u}_k=-ku_k+ku_{k+1},
\qquad
k=1,2,\ldots .$$

A second-order approximation is obtained by retaining $u_1=u$ and $u_2=u^2$ and discarding the term $u_3$. The resulting homogeneous system is

$$\frac{d}{dt}
\begin{pmatrix}
u_1\\
u_2
\end{pmatrix}
=
\begin{pmatrix}
-1 & 1\\
0 & -2
\end{pmatrix}
\begin{pmatrix}
u_1\\
u_2
\end{pmatrix},
\qquad
\begin{pmatrix}
u_1(0)\\
u_2(0)
\end{pmatrix}
=
\begin{pmatrix}
c\\
c^2
\end{pmatrix}.$$

Solving the linear system gives the second-order Type A approximant

$$\widetilde{u}^{\,A}_{N=2}(t)
=
u_{1}(t)
=
c\left[1+c\left(1-e^{-t}\right)\right]e^{-t}.$$

==== Type B approximant ====
To construct the approximant around the initial condition, introduce

$$u=w+c,
\qquad
w(0)=0.$$

The differential equation becomes

$$\dot{w}
=
(2c-1)w+w^2+c(c-1).$$

Define

$$\alpha=2c-1,
\qquad
\beta=c(c-1).$$

Retaining $w$ and $w^2$ gives the second-order non-homogeneous linear system

$$\frac{d}{dt}
\begin{pmatrix}
w\\
w^2
\end{pmatrix}
=
\begin{pmatrix}
\alpha & 1\\
2\beta & 2\alpha
\end{pmatrix}
\begin{pmatrix}
w\\
w^2
\end{pmatrix}
+
\begin{pmatrix}
\beta\\
0
\end{pmatrix},
\qquad
\begin{pmatrix}
w(0)\\
w^2(0)
\end{pmatrix}
=
\begin{pmatrix}
0\\
0
\end{pmatrix}.$$

Writing

$$M=
\begin{pmatrix}
\alpha & 1\\
2\beta & 2\alpha
\end{pmatrix},
\qquad
\mathbf{b}=
\begin{pmatrix}
\beta\\
0
\end{pmatrix},$$

the solution is

$$\begin{pmatrix}
w(t)\\
w^2(t)
\end{pmatrix}
=
M^{-1}\left(e^{Mt}-I\right)\mathbf{b},$$

when $M$ is invertible. The second-order Type B approximant is therefore

$$\begin{array}{l}
\widetilde{u}^{\,B}_{N=2}(t)=c+w(t) = \\[4pt]
\displaystyle
c\Biggl\{
1+\frac{c-1}{3c(c-1)+1}
\Biggl[
1-2c+\frac{1}{2\xi}
\Biggl(
\left[(2c-1)+6c(c-1)+1\right]e^{\lambda_-t}
\\[4pt]
+\left[(2c-1)-6c(c-1)-1\right]e^{\lambda_+t}
\Biggr)
\Biggr]
\Biggr\}
\end{array}$$

where $\xi\equiv\sqrt{1+12c(c-1)}$, and $\lambda_\pm=[3(2c-1)\pm\xi]/2$ are the eigenvalues of $M$. Although this expression is algebraically more involved than the Type A approximant, centring the construction at $u(0)=c$ generally improves its local accuracy.

The plot compares the exact solutions with second- and third-order Type A approximants constructed around the two equilibrium points and with a second-order Type B approximant constructed around each initial condition.

Riccati equation. Exact solutions (black dotted curves) and Carleman approximants (solid curves) as functions of $t$ for four initial conditions, $c=1.1,0.9,0.5,-0.8$. The subscript in the legend indicates the point around which the approximant is centred, and the superscript gives its order. Dashed lines are the two equilibrium solutions.

=== Two-dimensional example: center ===
Consider the two-dimensional nonlinear system

$$\dot{x}=-y-xy,
\qquad
\dot{y}=x+xy,$$

with initial condition

$$x(0)=a,
\qquad
y(0)=b.$$

The system has an equilibrium at $(0,0)$, which is a center and is stable in the sense of Lyapunov, but not asymptotically stable. It also has a saddle point at $(-1,-1)$. For $x,y>-1$, its trajectories satisfy the first integral

$$x-\ln(1+x)+y-\ln(1+y)=C,$$

where $C$ is constant along each trajectory.

==== Type A approximant ====
For the Type A construction, consider only the equilibrium point $(0,0)$. At second order, introduce the enlarged set of variables

$$\mathbf{X}
=
\begin{pmatrix}
y\\
y^2\\
x\\
xy\\
x^2
\end{pmatrix}.$$

After discarding terms of degree greater than two, the Carleman system is

$$\frac{d}{dt}
\begin{pmatrix}
y\\
y^2\\
x\\
xy\\
x^2
\end{pmatrix}
=
\begin{pmatrix}
0 & 0 & 1 & 1 & 0\\
0 & 0 & 0 & 2 & 0\\
-1 & 0 & 0 & -1 & 0\\
0 & -1 & 0 & 0 & 1\\
0 & 0 & 0 & -2 & 0
\end{pmatrix}
\begin{pmatrix}
y\\
y^2\\
x\\
xy\\
x^2
\end{pmatrix},$$

with initial condition

$$\mathbf{X}(0)
=
\begin{pmatrix}
b\\
b^2\\
a\\
ab\\
a^2
\end{pmatrix}.$$

Thus,

$$\mathbf{X}(t)=e^{Mt}\mathbf{X}(0),$$

where $M$ is the displayed coefficient matrix. The second-order Type A approximants $\widetilde{x}^{\,A}_{N=2}(t)$ and $\widetilde{y}^{\,A}_{N=2}(t)$ are respectively the third and first components of $\mathbf{X}(t)$.

==== Type B approximant ====
To centre the approximation at the initial condition $(a,b)$, introduce

$$w=x-a,
\qquad
z=y-b,
\qquad
w(0)=z(0)=0.$$

The transformed nonlinear system is

$$\dot{w}
=
-bw-(1+a)z-wz-b(1+a),$$

$$\dot{z}
=
(1+b)w+az+wz+a(1+b).$$

At first Carleman order, the nonlinear term $wz$ is discarded, yielding

$$\frac{d}{dt}
\begin{pmatrix}
w\\
z
\end{pmatrix}
=
\begin{pmatrix}
-b & -(1+a)\\
1+b & a
\end{pmatrix}
\begin{pmatrix}
w\\
z
\end{pmatrix}
+
\begin{pmatrix}
-b(1+a)\\
a(1+b)
\end{pmatrix}.$$

Let

$$M=
\begin{pmatrix}
-b & -(1+a)\\
1+b & a
\end{pmatrix},
\qquad
\mathbf{h}=
\begin{pmatrix}
-b(1+a)\\
a(1+b)
\end{pmatrix}.$$

The first-order Type B approximant is

$$\begin{pmatrix}
\widetilde{x}^{\,B}_{N=1}(t)\\
\widetilde{y}^{\,B}_{N=1}(t)
\end{pmatrix}
=
\begin{pmatrix}
a\\
b
\end{pmatrix}
+
M^{-1}\left(e^{Mt}-I\right)\mathbf{h},$$

when $M$ is invertible. The eigenvalues of the coefficient matrix are

$$\lambda_{\pm}
=
\frac{1}{2}
\left[
a-b
\pm
\sqrt{(a-b)^2-4(1+a+b)}
\right].$$

Despite being only first order, the Type B approximation can have a numerical accuracy intermediate between the first- and second-order Type A approximants because it is centred directly on the trajectory's initial condition.

The phase portrait compares second-order Type A approximants constructed around the two critical points with first-order Type B approximants constructed around several initial conditions.

Phase portrait of the nonlinear center system. Blue and red curves are second-order Carleman approximants constructed around the critical points, while green curves are first-order approximants constructed around the initial conditions. The approximate solutions are compared with the exact trajectories (dotted curves). Gray curves are numerical solutions included as visual aids, and circles mark the initial conditions.

== Application to epidemiology ==
The Carleman approximants for the SIR model yield an explicit algebraic estimator of the time-dependent effective reproduction number $R_t$ from prevalence data. This application illustrates how an analytic approximation of a nonlinear system can be used not only to approximate its trajectories, but also to obtain closed-form expressions for quantities of practical interest.

Consider the SIR model

$$\dot{S}=-\beta SI,
\qquad
\dot{I}=\beta SI-\xi I,
\qquad
\dot{R}=\xi I,$$

where $S$, $I$, and $R$ are the susceptible, infectious, and removed population fractions, respectively. The transmission and removal rates are denoted by $\beta$ and $\xi$. The effective reproduction number is

$$R_t=S(t)\frac{\beta}{\xi}.$$

To account explicitly for the approximately exponential behaviour of the infectious population, the change of variable

$$I=e^Y$$

transforms the first two SIR equations into the system

$$\dot{S}=-\beta Se^Y,
\qquad
\dot{Y}=\beta S-\xi.$$

This formulation is referred to as the SYR system. Its Carleman sequence can be constructed using nonlinear terms of the form $S^i e^{jY}$, with approximation order $N=i+j$.

Let

$$S(0)=a,
\qquad
I(0)=b,
\qquad
q=\frac{b}{a},
\qquad
R_q=a\frac{\beta}{\xi},$$

where $R_q$ is the value of the effective reproduction number at the time chosen as the origin. At second order, the Carleman approximant for the logarithmic prevalence is

$$Y_{N=2}(t)
=
\ln b
+
(R_q-1)\xi t
+
qR_q^2
\left(
1-\xi t-e^{-\xi t}
\right).$$

Because this approximation is an explicit analytic function of the epidemiological parameters, it can be fitted directly to prevalence data. Assume that the removal rate $\xi$ is known and remains approximately constant within a short time interval, and that prevalence $I$ has been reconstructed from incidence data. For observations indexed by $i=-T,\ldots,T$, define

$$\tau_i=\xi t_i,
\qquad
z_i=1-\tau_i-e^{-\tau_i},
\qquad
y_i=\ln I(t_i).$$

The second-order approximation is fitted over a time window containing $2T+1$ observations by minimizing the residual sum of squares

$$\operatorname{RSS}
=
\frac{1}{2}
\sum_{i=-T}^{T}
\left[
\ln b
+
(R_q-1)\tau_i
+
qR_q^2z_i
-
y_i
\right]^2$$

with respect to the parameters $\ln b$, $R_q$, and $q$. The parameters are assumed to remain approximately constant within the selected time window. The resulting value of $R_q$ estimates the effective reproduction number $R_t$ at the central point of the interval.

Although the resulting variational equations are nonlinear, their structure allows them to be solved in closed form. Define the centred quantities

$$\widetilde{\tau}_i=\tau_i-\overline{\tau},
\qquad
\widetilde{z}_i=z_i-\overline{z},
\qquad
\widetilde{y}_i=y_i-\overline{y},$$

where

$$\overline{\tau}
=
\frac{1}{2T+1}\sum_{i=-T}^{T}\tau_i,
\qquad
\overline{z}
=
\frac{1}{2T+1}\sum_{i=-T}^{T}z_i,
\qquad
\overline{y}
=
\frac{1}{2T+1}\sum_{i=-T}^{T}y_i.$$

Minimization of the residual sum of squares then gives the algebraic estimator

$$R_t
=
1-
\frac{
\left(\sum_{i=-T}^{T}\widetilde{y}_i z_i\right)
\left(\sum_{i=-T}^{T}\widetilde{z}_i\tau_i\right)
-
\left(\sum_{i=-T}^{T}\widetilde{y}_i\tau_i\right)
\left(\sum_{i=-T}^{T}\widetilde{z}_i z_i\right)
}{
\left(\sum_{i=-T}^{T}\widetilde{\tau}_i z_i\right)
\left(\sum_{i=-T}^{T}\widetilde{z}_i\tau_i\right)
-
\left(\sum_{i=-T}^{T}\widetilde{\tau}_i\tau_i\right)
\left(\sum_{i=-T}^{T}\widetilde{z}_i z_i\right)
}.$$

Thus, once the prevalence and removal time scale have been specified, $R_t$ can be estimated from finite sums over the data. The expression has been tested using simulated epidemic waves with time-dependent transmission rates and SARS-CoV-2 incidence data from the Valencian Country, Spain, yielding estimates consistent with the corresponding reference values.

== Control-theoretic formulation ==
In control theory and state estimation, Carleman linearization can be applied to nonlinear systems with external inputs or disturbances. One such formulation considers the system

$$\dot{x}=f(x)+\sum_{j=1}^{r}g_j(x)d_j(t),$$

where $x\in\mathbb{R}^n$ is the state vector, $f$ and $g_j$ are analytic vector fields, and $d_j(t)$ denotes the $j$-th component of an external input or disturbance. Because the disturbances may depend explicitly on time, the system is not autonomous in general. When the functions $d_j(t)$ are treated as inputs, the lifted model obtained below is bilinear in the lifted state and the inputs.

Let $x_0$ be a nominal point. After introducing the shifted coordinate $z=x-x_0$, the nominal point is placed at the origin. For notational simplicity, the shifted variable is again denoted by $x$. The vector fields may then be approximated by finite Taylor expansions,

$$f(x)\simeq\sum_{k=0}^{\eta}A_kx^{[k]},
\qquad
g_j(x)\simeq\sum_{k=0}^{\eta}B_{j,k}x^{[k]},$$

where $\eta$ is the Taylor truncation degree and $A_k$ and $B_{j,k}$ are the corresponding matricized Taylor coefficient tensors,

$$A_k=\frac{1}{k!}D^kf(0),
\qquad
B_{j,k}=\frac{1}{k!}D^kg_j(0).$$

Here, $x^{[k]}$ denotes the $k$-th Kronecker power,

$$x^{[k]}=
\underbrace{x\otimes x\otimes\cdots\otimes x}_{k\text{ factors}},$$

with the convention $x^{[0]}=1$.

The time derivative of the $i$-th Kronecker power is

$$\frac{d x^{[i]}}{dt}
=
\sum_{l=0}^{i-1}
x^{[l]}\otimes\dot{x}\otimes x^{[i-1-l]}.$$

Substitution of the Taylor expansions generates Kronecker powers of progressively higher degree. To obtain a finite-dimensional approximation, the hierarchy is truncated at a maximum lifted degree $N$. Discarding terms whose total degree exceeds $N$ gives, for $i=1,\ldots,N$,

$$\frac{d x^{[i]}}{dt}
\simeq
\sum_{k=0}^{\min(\eta,N-i+1)}
A_{i,k}x^{[i+k-1]}
+
\sum_{j=1}^{r}
\sum_{k=0}^{\min(\eta,N-i+1)}
B_{j,i,k}x^{[i+k-1]}d_j(t),$$

where

$$A_{i,k}
=
\sum_{l=0}^{i-1}
I_n^{[l]}\otimes A_k\otimes I_n^{[i-1-l]},$$

and similarly,

$$B_{j,i,k}
=
\sum_{l=0}^{i-1}
I_n^{[l]}\otimes B_{j,k}\otimes I_n^{[i-1-l]}.$$

In these expressions, $I_n$ is the $n$-dimensional identity matrix, $I_n^{[l]}$ denotes its $l$-th Kronecker power, and $I_n^{[0]}=1$.

Introducing the truncated lifted state

$$x_{\otimes}
=
\begin{bmatrix}
x^{T} &
\left(x^{[2]}\right)^{T} &
\cdots &
\left(x^{[N]}\right)^{T}
\end{bmatrix}^{T},$$

the system can be written in block-matrix form as

$$\dot{x}_{\otimes}
=
\mathcal{A}x_{\otimes}
+\mathcal{a}_0
+
\sum_{j=1}^{r}
\left(
\mathcal{B}_j x_{\otimes}
+\mathcal{b}_{j,0}
\right)d_j(t)
+r_N(x,d),$$

where $\mathcal{A}$ and $\mathcal{B}_j$ are assembled from the blocks $A_{i,k}$ and $B_{j,i,k}$, respectively. The vectors $\mathcal{a}_0$ and $\mathcal{b}_{j,0}$ contain the constant terms of the Taylor expansions, while $r_N(x,d)$ represents the residual produced by the Taylor and Carleman truncations.

If the disturbances $d_j(t)$ are prescribed functions of time and the residual is neglected, the truncated model is a finite-dimensional affine linear time-varying system. When the disturbances are regarded as independent inputs, it is a bilinear state–input system. This formulation has been used, for example, in moving-horizon estimation of nonlinear processes.

== Convergence and limitations ==
Except in particular systems for which the Carleman sequence closes after finitely many steps, a finite-order Carleman system provides an approximation rather than an exact representation of the original nonlinear dynamics. The accuracy depends on the order of truncation, the point in phase space around which the approximant is constructed, the initial condition, and the time interval considered.

The dimension of the enlarged linear system grows rapidly with both the number of original variables and the approximation order. Consequently, the computation and analytic exponentiation of the coefficient matrix may become difficult at high orders. Type B approximants may offer better local accuracy, but require the solution of a non-homogeneous system and generally have more complicated algebraic expressions than Type A approximants.

Convergence and truncation-error estimates have been established for particular classes of nonlinear systems, but the applicable bounds and time intervals depend on assumptions about the vector field and the solution.

Because finite-order Carleman approximants are solutions of linear differential systems with constant coefficients, they consist of linear combinations of functions such as $t^k e^{\lambda t}$, $t^k\sin(\omega t)$, and $t^k\cos(\omega t)$. They therefore do not reproduce finite singularities of an exact nonlinear solution in the complex time plane. They may also fail to preserve global dynamical structures such as closed orbits; at higher orders, repeated eigenvalues can generate secular terms that prevent an approximate trajectory from closing.

== See also ==
- Jabotinsky matrix
- Composition operator
- Koopman operator
