= Composition operator =

Linear operator in mathematics

In mathematics, the composition operator $C_\phi$ with symbol $\phi$ is a linear operator defined by the rule
$$C_\phi (f) = f \circ \phi$$
where $f \circ \phi$ denotes function composition. It is also encountered in composition of permutations in permutation groups.

The study of composition operators is covered by AMS category 47B33.

== In physics ==
In physics, and especially the area of dynamical systems, the composition operator is usually referred to as the Koopman operator, named after Bernard Koopman. Its wild surge in popularity is sometimes jokingly called "Koopmania" - a popularity that has begun spreading in Machine Learning as well. It is the left-adjoint of the transfer operator of Frobenius–Perron.

== In Borel functional calculus ==
Using the language of category theory, the composition operator is a pull-back on the space of measurable functions; it is adjoint to the transfer operator in the same way that the pull-back is adjoint to the push-forward; the composition operator is the inverse image functor.

Since the domain considered here is that of Borel functions, the above describes the Koopman operator as it appears in Borel functional calculus.

== In holomorphic functional calculus ==
The domain of a composition operator can be taken more narrowly, as some Banach space, often consisting of holomorphic functions: for example, some Hardy space or Bergman space. In this case, the composition operator lies in the realm of some functional calculus, such as the holomorphic functional calculus.

Interesting questions posed in the study of composition operators often relate to how the spectral properties of the operator depend on the function space. Other questions include whether $C_\phi$ is compact or trace-class; answers typically depend on how the function $\varphi$ behaves on the boundary of some domain.

When the transfer operator is a left-shift operator, the Koopman operator, as its adjoint, can be taken to be the right-shift operator. An appropriate basis, explicitly manifesting the shift, can often be found in the orthogonal polynomials. When these are orthogonal on the real number line, the shift is given by the Jacobi operator. When the polynomials are orthogonal on some region of the complex plane (viz, in Bergman space), the Jacobi operator is replaced by a Hessenberg operator.

== Applications ==
In mathematics, composition operators commonly occur in the study of shift operators, for example, in the Beurling–Lax theorem and the Wold decomposition. Shift operators can be studied as one-dimensional spin lattices. Composition operators appear in the theory of Aleksandrov–Clark measures.

The eigenvalue equation of the composition operator is Schröder's equation, and the principal eigenfunction $f(x)$ is often called Schröder's function or Koenigs function.

The composition operator has been used in data-driven techniques for dynamical systems in the context of dynamic mode decomposition algorithms, which approximate the modes and eigenvalues of the composition operator.

== See also ==
- Jabotinsky matrix
- Carleman linearization
- Composition ring – Algebraic structure
- Multiplication operator – Linear operator scaling by a fixed function
- Transpose of a linear map – Induced map between the dual spaces of the two vector spaces
- Dynamic mode decomposition
