= Quasi-analytic function =

In mathematics, a quasi-analytic class of functions is a generalization of the class of real analytic functions based upon the following fact: If f is an analytic function on an interval [a,b] ⊂ R, and at some point f and all of its derivatives are zero, then f is identically zero on all of [a,b]. Quasi-analytic classes are broader classes of functions for which this statement still holds true.

== Definitions ==
Let $M=\{M_k\}_{k=0}^\infty$ be a sequence of positive real numbers. Then the Denjoy–Carleman class of functions C^{M}([a,b]) is defined to be those f ∈ C^{∞}([a,b]) which satisfy

$$\left |\frac{d^kf}{dx^k}(x) \right | \leq A^{k+1} k! M_k$$

for all x ∈ [a,b], some constant A, and all non-negative integers k. If M_{k} = 1 this is exactly the class of real analytic functions on [a,b].

The class C^{M}([a,b]) is said to be quasi-analytic if whenever f ∈ C^{M}([a,b]) and

$$\frac{d^k f}{dx^k}(x) = 0$$

for some point x ∈ [a,b] and all k, then f is identically equal to zero.

A function f is called a quasi-analytic function if f is in some quasi-analytic class.

=== Quasi-analytic functions of several variables ===
For a function $f:\mathbb{R}^n\to\mathbb{R}$ and multi-indexes $j=(j_1,j_2,\ldots,j_n)\in\mathbb{N}^n$, denote $|j|=j_1+j_2+\ldots+j_n$, and

$$D^j=\frac{\partial^j}{\partial x_1^{j_1}\partial x_2^{j_2}\ldots\partial x_n^{j_n}}$$
$$j!=j_1!j_2!\ldots j_n!$$

and

$$x^j=x_1^{j_1}x_2^{j_2}\ldots x_n^{j_n}.$$

Then $f$ is called quasi-analytic on the open set $U\subset\mathbb{R}^n$ if for every compact $K\subset U$ there is a constant $A$ such that

$$\left|D^jf(x)\right|\leq A^{|j|+1}j!M_{|j|}$$

for all multi-indexes $j\in\mathbb{N}^n$ and all points $x\in K$.

The Denjoy–Carleman class of functions of $n$ variables with respect to the sequence $M$ on the set $U$ can be denoted $C_n^M(U)$, although other notations abound.

The Denjoy–Carleman class $C_n^M(U)$ is said to be quasi-analytic when the only function in it having all its partial derivatives equal to zero at a point is the function identically equal to zero.

A function of several variables is said to be quasi-analytic when it belongs to a quasi-analytic Denjoy–Carleman class.

=== Quasi-analytic classes with respect to logarithmically convex sequences ===
In the definitions above it is possible to assume that $M_1=1$ and that the sequence $M_k$ is non-decreasing.

The sequence $M_k$ is said to be logarithmically convex, if

$M_{k+1}/M_k$ is increasing.

When $M_k$ is logarithmically convex, then $(M_k)^{1/k}$ is increasing and

$M_rM_s\leq M_{r+s}$ for all $(r,s)\in\mathbb{N}^2$.

The quasi-analytic class $C_n^M$ with respect to a logarithmically convex sequence $M$ satisfies:

- $C_n^M$ is a ring. In particular it is closed under multiplication.
- $C_n^M$ is closed under composition. Specifically, if $f=(f_1,f_2,\ldots f_p)\in (C_n^M)^p$ and $g\in C_p^M$, then $g\circ f\in C_n^M$.

== Denjoy–Carleman theorem ==
The Denjoy–Carleman theorem, proved by Carleman (1926) after Denjoy (1921) gave some partial results, gives criteria on the sequence M under which C^{M}([a,b]) is a quasi-analytic class. It states that the following conditions are equivalent:

- C^{M}([a,b]) is quasi-analytic.
- $\sum 1/L_j = \infty$ where $L_j= \inf_{k\ge j}(k\cdot M_k^{1/k})$.
- $\sum_j \frac{1}{j}(M_j^*)^{-1/j} = \infty$, where M_{j}^{*} is the largest log convex sequence bounded above by M_{j}.
- $\sum_j\frac{M_{j-1}^*}{(j+1)M_j^*} = \infty.$

The proof that the last two conditions are equivalent to the second uses Carleman's inequality.

Example: Denjoy (1921) pointed out that if M_{n} is given by one of the sequences

$$1,\, {(\ln n)}^n,\, {(\ln n)}^n\,{(\ln \ln n)}^n,\, {(\ln n)}^n\,{(\ln \ln n)}^n\,{(\ln \ln \ln n)}^n, \dots,$$

then the corresponding class is quasi-analytic. The first sequence gives analytic functions.

== Additional properties ==
For a logarithmically convex sequence $M$ the following properties of the corresponding class of functions hold:

- $C^M$ contains the analytic functions, and it is equal to it if and only if $\sup_{j\geq 1}(M_j)^{1/j}<\infty$
- If $N$ is another logarithmically convex sequence, with $M_j\leq C^j N_j$ for some constant $C$, then $C^M\subset C^N$.
- $C^M$ is stable under differentiation if and only if $\sup_{j\geq 1}(M_{j+1}/M_j)^{1/j}<\infty$.
- For any infinitely differentiable function $f$ there are quasi-analytic rings $C^M$ and $C^N$ and elements $g\in C^M$, and $h\in C^N$, such that $f=g+h$.

=== Weierstrass division ===
A function $g:\mathbb{R}^n\to\mathbb{R}$ is said to be regular of order $d$ with respect to $x_n$ if $g(0,x_n)=h(x_n)x_n^d$ and $h(0)\neq 0$. Given $g$ regular of order $d$ with respect to $x_n$, a ring $A_n$ of real or complex functions of $n$ variables is said to satisfy the Weierstrass division with respect to $g$ if for every $f\in A_n$ there is $q\in A$, and $h_1,h_2,\ldots,h_{d-1}\in A_{n-1}$ such that

$f=gq+h$ with $h(x',x_n)=\sum_{j=0}^{d-1}h_{j}(x')x_n^j$.

While the ring of analytic functions and the ring of formal power series both satisfy the Weierstrass division property, the same is not true for other quasi-analytic classes.

If $M$ is logarithmically convex and $C^M$ is not equal to the class of analytic function, then $C^M$ does not satisfy the Weierstrass division property with respect to $g(x_1,x_2,\ldots,x_n)=x_1+x_2^2$.
