= Åke Pleijel =

Swedish mathematician (1913–1989)

Åke Vilhelm Carl Pleijel
- Born: 10 August 1913; Stockholm, Sweden
- Died: 24 September 1989 (aged 76)
- Education: Stockholm University
- Scientific career
- Fields: Mathematics
- Workplaces: Lund University; Uppsala University
- Doctoral advisor: Torsten Carleman
- Doctoral students: Jaak Peetre

Åke Vilhelm Carl Pleijel (10 August 1913 – 24 September 1989) was a Swedish mathematician.

He completed his PhD in mathematics at Stockholm University in 1940 (with Torsten Carleman as supervisor), and later became Professor of Mathematics at Uppsala University.

Åke Vilhelm Carl Pleijel published the paper Minakshisundaram & Pleijel (1949) in which the Minakshisundaram–Pleijel zeta function was introduced.
