= Rolf Holmgren =

Swedish actor and scriptwriter (born 1946)

Rolf Erling Holmgren (born 24 March 1946) is a Swedish actor and scriptwriter.

He was born in Ystad in the southern Swedish province of Skåne. He took acting lessons in Stockholm and has been mostly active on the theater scene in Gothenburg, but he has also been in some films and on TV.
