= Holmgren's uniqueness theorem =

Uniqueness for linear partial differential equations with real analytic coefficients

In the theory of partial differential equations, Holmgren's uniqueness theorem, or simply Holmgren's theorem, named after the Swedish mathematician Erik Albert Holmgren (1873–1943), is a uniqueness result for linear partial differential equations with real analytic coefficients.

== Simple form of Holmgren's theorem ==
We will use the multi-index notation: Let $\alpha=\{\alpha_1,\dots,\alpha_n\}\in \N_0^n,$, with $\N_0$ standing for the nonnegative integers; denote $|\alpha|=\alpha_1+\cdots+\alpha_n$ and

$$\partial_x^\alpha = \left(\frac{\partial}{\partial x_1}\right)^{\alpha_1} \cdots \left(\frac{\partial}{\partial x_n}\right)^{\alpha_n}$$.

Holmgren's theorem in its simpler form could be stated as follows:

Assume that P = ∑_{|α| ≤m} A_{α}(x)∂^{α}_{x} is an elliptic partial differential operator with real-analytic coefficients. If Pu is real-analytic in a connected open neighborhood Ω ⊂ R^{n}, then u is also real-analytic.

This statement, with "analytic" replaced by "smooth", is Hermann Weyl's classical lemma on elliptic regularity:

If P is an elliptic differential operator and Pu is smooth in Ω, then u is also smooth in Ω.

This statement can be proved using Sobolev spaces.

== Classical form ==
Let $\Omega$ be a connected open neighborhood in $\R^n$, and let $\Sigma$ be an analytic hypersurface in $\Omega$, such that there are two open subsets $\Omega_{+}$ and $\Omega_{-}$ in $\Omega$, nonempty and connected, not intersecting $\Sigma$ nor each other, such that $\Omega=\Omega_{-}\cup\Sigma\cup\Omega_{+}$.

Let $P=\sum_{|\alpha|\le m}A_\alpha(x)\partial_x^\alpha$ be a differential operator with real-analytic coefficients.

Assume that the hypersurface $\Sigma$ is noncharacteristic with respect to $P$ at every one of its points:

$$\mathop{\rm Char}P\cap N^*\Sigma=\emptyset$$.

Above,

$$\mathop{\rm Char}P=\{(x,\xi)\subset T^*\R^n\backslash 0:\sigma_p(P)(x,\xi)=0\},\text{ with }\sigma_p(x,\xi)=\sum_{|\alpha|=m}i^{|\alpha|}A_\alpha(x)\xi^\alpha$$

the principal symbol of $P$. $N^*\Sigma$ is a conormal bundle to $\Sigma$, defined as $N^*\Sigma=\{(x,\xi)\in T^*\R^n:x\in\Sigma,\,\xi|_{T_x\Sigma}=0\}$.

The classical formulation of Holmgren's theorem is as follows:

Holmgren's theorem
Let $u$ be a distribution in $\Omega$ such that $Pu=0$ in $\Omega$. If $u$ vanishes in $\Omega_{-}$, then it vanishes in an open neighborhood of $\Sigma$.

== Relation to the Cauchy–Kowalevski theorem ==
Consider the problem

$$\partial_t^m u=F(t,x,\partial_x^\alpha\,\partial_t^k u),
\quad
\alpha\in\N_0^n,
\quad
k\in\N_0,
\quad
|\alpha|+k\le m,
\quad
k\le m-1,$$

with the Cauchy data

$$\partial_t^k u|_{t=0}=\phi_k(x), \qquad 0\le k\le m-1,$$

Assume that $F(t,x,z)$ is real-analytic with respect to all its arguments in the neighborhood of $t=0,x=0,z=0$ and that $\phi_k(x)$ are real-analytic in the neighborhood of $x=0$.

Theorem (Cauchy–Kowalevski)
There is a unique real-analytic solution $u(t,x)$ in the neighborhood of $(t,x)=(0,0)\in(\R\times\R^n)$.

Note that the Cauchy–Kowalevski theorem does not exclude the existence of solutions which are not real-analytic.

On the other hand, in the case when $F(t,x,z)$ is polynomial of order one in $z$, so that

$$\partial_t^m u = F(t,x,\partial_x^\alpha\,\partial_t^k u)
= \sum_{\alpha\in\N_0^n,0\le k\le m-1, |\alpha| + k\le m}A_{\alpha,k}(t,x) \, \partial_x^\alpha \, \partial_t^k u,$$

Holmgren's theorem states that the solution $u$ is real-analytic and hence, by the Cauchy–Kowalevski theorem, is unique.

== See also ==
- Cauchy–Kowalevski theorem
- FBI transform
