= Louis Shapiro (mathematician) =

American mathematician

Louis W. Shapiro
- Born: United States
- Education: Harvard University; University of Maryland, College Park
- Scientific career
- Fields: Mathematician
- Doctoral students: Naiomi Cameron

Louis Welles Shapiro (born 1941) is an American mathematician working in the fields of combinatorics and finite group theory. He is an emeritus professor at Howard University.

Shapiro attended Harvard University for his undergraduate studies and then the University of Maryland, College Park for graduate school. Shapiro is most known for introducing the Riordan array, named after mathematician John Riordan, and developing the theory around it. He has been an organizer of and speaker at the annual International Conference on Riordan Arrays and Related Topics, which has been held annually beginning 2014.
