= Jabotinsky matrix =

In mathematics, the Jabotinsky matrix (sometimes called iteration matrix or power matrix) is an infinite matrix used to convert function composition into matrix multiplication. It is often used in iteration theory to find the continuous iteration of functions. The matrix is named after mathematician Eri Jabotinsky.

== Definition ==
Let $f$ be a formal power series. There exists coefficients $(B_{n,k})_{n, k\geq 0}$ such that
$$f(x)^k = \sum_{n=0}^{\infty} B_{n,k} x^n.$$
The Jabotinsky matrix of $f(x)$ is defined as the infinite matrix

$$\mathbf B(f) = \left(\begin{array}{cccc}
B_{0,0} & B_{0,1} & B_{0,2} & \cdots \\
B_{1,0} & B_{1,1} & B_{1,2} & \cdots \\
B_{2,0} & B_{2,1} & B_{2,2} & \cdots \\
\vdots&\vdots&\vdots&\ddots
\end{array}\right).$$

When $f(0) = 0$, $\mathbf B(f)$ becomes an infinite lower triangular matrix whose entries are given by ordinary Bell polynomials evaluated at the coefficients of $f$. This is why $\mathbf B(f)$ is sometimes referred to as a Bell matrix.

== History ==
Jabotinsky matrices have a long history, and were perhaps used for the first time in the context of iteration theory by Albert A. Bennett in 1915. Jabotinsky later pursued Bennett's research and applied them to Faber polynomials. Jabotinsky matrices were popularized during the 70s by Louis Comtet's book Advanced Combinatorics, where he referred to them as iteration matrices (which is a denomination also sometimes used nowadays). This article's denomination appeared later. Donald Knuth uses the name convolution matrix.

== Properties ==
Jabotinsky matrices satisfy the fundamental relationship
$$\textbf B(f \circ g) = \textbf B(g)\textbf B(f)$$
which makes the Jabotinsky matrix $\mathbf B(f)$ a (direct) representation of $f(x)$. Here the term $f \circ g$ denotes the composition of functions $f(g(x))$.

The fundamental property implies

- $\textbf B(f^n) = \textbf B(f)^n$, where $f^n$ is an iterated function and $n$ is a natural number.
- $\textbf B(f^{-1}) = \textbf B(f)^{-1}$, where $f^{-1}$ is the inverse function, if $f$ has a compositional inverse.
- $$\begin{bmatrix}1,x,x^2,...\end{bmatrix} \textbf B(f) = \begin{bmatrix}1,f(x),f(x)^2,...\end{bmatrix}.$$

== Generalization ==
Given a sequence $(\Omega_n)_{n\ge0}$, we can instead define the matrix with the coefficient $(B_{n,k}^\Omega)_{n, k\geq 0}$ by
$$\Omega_k f(x)^k = \sum_{n=0}^{\infty} B^\Omega_{n,k} \Omega_n x^n.$$
If $(\Omega_n)_{n\ge0}$ is the constant sequence equal to $1$, we recover Jabotinsky matrices. In some contexts, the sequence is chosen to be $\Omega_n = 1/n!$, so that the entry are given by regular Bell polynomials. This is a more convenient form for functions such as $f(x) = -\log(1-x)$ and $f(x) = e^x - 1$ where Stirling numbers of the first and second kind appear in the matrices (see the examples).

This generalization gives a completely equivalent matrix since $B_{n,k}^\Omega \frac{\Omega_n}{\Omega_k} = B_{n,k}$.

== Examples ==
- The Jabotinsky matrix of a constant is:
  $$\mathbf B(a) = \left(\begin{array}{cccc}
1&a&a^2& \cdots \\
0&0&0& \cdots \\
0&0&0& \cdots \\
\vdots&\vdots&\vdots&\ddots
\end{array}\right)$$
- The Jabotinsky matrix of a constant multiple is:
  $$\textbf B(cx) = \left(\begin{array}{cccc}
1&0&0& \cdots \\
0&c&0& \cdots \\
0&0&c^2& \cdots \\
\vdots&\vdots&\vdots&\ddots
\end{array}\right)$$
- The Jabotinsky matrix of the successor function:
  $$\textbf B(1+x) = \left(\begin{array}{ccccc}
1&1&1&1& \cdots \\
0&1&2&3& \cdots \\
0&0&1&3& \cdots \\
0&0&0&1& \cdots \\
\vdots&\vdots&\vdots&\vdots&\ddots
\end{array}\right)$$
  The matrix displays Pascal's triangle.
- The Jabotinsky matrix of the exponential function is given by $\textbf B(\exp)_{n,k} = \frac{k^n}{n!}$.
- The Jabotinsky matrix of the logarithm is related to the (unsigned) Stirling numbers of the first kind scaled by factorials:
  $$\textbf B(-\log(1 - x)) = \left(\begin{array}{cccccc}
1&0&0&0&0& \cdots \\
0&1&0&0&0& \cdots \\
0&\frac{1}{2}&1&0&0& \cdots \\
0&\frac{1}{3}&1&1&0& \cdots \\
0&\frac{1}{4}&\frac{11}{12}&\frac{3}{2}&1& \cdots \\
\vdots&\vdots&\vdots&\vdots&\vdots&\ddots
\end{array}\right)$$
  $$\textbf B(-\log(1 - x))_{n, k} = \left[{n \atop k}\right] \frac{k!}{n!}$$
- The Jabotinsky matrix of the exponential function minus 1 is related to the Stirling numbers of the second kind scaled by factorials:
  $$\textbf B(\exp(x) - 1) = \left(\begin{array}{cccccc}
1&0&0&0&0& \cdots \\
0&1&0&0&0& \cdots \\
0&\frac{1}{2}&1&0&0& \cdots \\
0&\frac{1}{6}&1&1&0& \cdots \\
0&\frac{1}{24}&\frac{7}{12}&\frac{3}{2}&1& \cdots \\
\vdots&\vdots&\vdots&\vdots&\vdots&\ddots
\end{array}\right)$$
  $$\textbf B(\exp(x) - 1)_{n,k} = \left\{{n \atop k}\right\} \frac{k!}{n!}$$

== Alternative convention ==
Some authors, which include Bennett and Jabotinsky in their original work, use the transpose convention $\mathbf B(f)^{\text{T}}$ for the matrix, which is an infinite upper triangular matrix when $f(0) = 0$. The fundamental relationship becomes
$$\textbf B(f \circ g)^{\text{T}} = \textbf B(f)^{\text{T}}\textbf B(g)^{\text{T}},$$
which preserves the order of the operations.

== Related matrices ==
- Jabotinsky matrices are a special case of the later introduced Riordan arrays.
- They are also related to Carleman linearization and Carleman (embedding) matrices.
- Grunsky matrices can be expressed with Jabotinsky matrices.

== See also ==
- Composition operator
- Schröder's equation
- Faà di Bruno's formula
- Umbral calculus
