= Erik Albert Holmgren =

Swedish mathematician

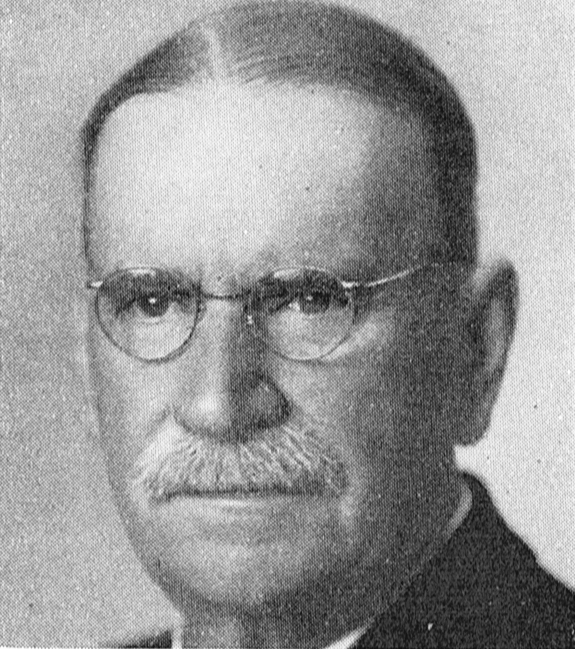
- Born: 7 July 1872
- Died: 18 March 1943 (aged 70); Uppsala
- Education: Uppsala University
- Known for: Holmgren's uniqueness theorem
- Scientific career
- Fields: Mathematics
- Workplaces: Uppsala University
- Doctoral students: Torsten Carleman

Erik Albert Holmgren (7 July 1872 – 18 March 1943) was a Swedish mathematician known for contributions to partial differential equations. Holmgren's uniqueness theorem is named after him. Torsten Carleman was one of his students. His father was the mathematician Hjalmar Holmgren (1822 – 1885) and his siblings include the forester Anders Holmgren and the zoologist Nils Holmgren.

Holmgren enrolled at Uppsala University in the autumn of 1890 and received his Bachelor of Arts degree on January 31, 1893. He received his Licentiate of Philosophy degree on December 14, 1895, and defended his dissertation for graduation on February 19, 1898. Holmgren became a docent in mathematics on March 8, 1898, and received his Doctor of Philosophy degree on May 31, 1898, all at Uppsala University. He was an extraordinary professor of mathematics at Uppsala University from October 1, 1901, to January 1, 1902, and from October 15 to March 15, 1907.

At the age of thirty-five when Holmgren's was called to be a professor in Uppsala, he had already conducted research at the universities of Göttingen (1900–01), Paris (1902), and Rome (1905–06), which were the most important centers of mathematics at that time. He was appointed professor of mathematics at Uppsala University on March 15, 1907, and held the position until January 1, 1937. Holmgren was a member of the Royal Swedish Academy of Sciences from 1910 and a member of the Royal Swedish Academy of Letters from 1924.

Holmgren's research primarily concerned differential equations, especially the theory of partial differential equations and associated problems in functional theory.

Holmgren also appreciated the purely aesthetic side of mathematics as seen in the problems he composed for mathematical seminar exercises. As a teacher, he devoted himself with equal zeal and clarity to both elementary teaching and teaching for licentiate or doctoral degrees. Although Holmgren exhibited a strong temper during mathematical seminars, several of his students carried on his work and won fame throughout the mathematical world.

Holmgren also had an interest in art history. He had an interest in French culture since his youth, and often traveled to France and Italy to combine his holidays with his research trips. During his early years as a professor, Holmgren participated in student discussions and political activities that led to the peasant armament support march and the departure of the second Staafian government some years before World War I. He never married.
