= Ring lemma =

Lower bound on radii in circle packings

Construction showing the tight bound for the ring lemma

In the geometry of circle packings in the Euclidean plane, the ring lemma gives a lower bound on the sizes of adjacent circles in a circle packing.

== Statement ==
The lemma states: Let $n$ be any integer greater than or equal to three. Suppose that the unit circle is surrounded by a ring of $n$ interior-disjoint circles, all tangent to it, with consecutive circles in the ring tangent to each other. Then the minimum radius of any circle in the ring is at least the unit fraction
$$\frac{1}{F_{2n-3}-1}$$
where $F_i$ is the $i$th Fibonacci number.

The sequence of minimum radii, from $n=3$, begins

$\displaystyle 1, \frac{1}{4}, \frac{1}{12}, \frac{1}{33}, \frac{1}{88}, \frac{1}{232}, \dots$ (sequence A027941 in the OEIS)

Generalizations to three-dimensional space are also known.

== Construction ==
An infinite sequence of circles can be constructed, containing rings for each $n$ that exactly meet the bound of the ring lemma, showing that it is tight. The construction allows halfplanes to be considered as degenerate circles with infinite radius, and includes additional tangencies between the circles beyond those required in the statement of the lemma. It begins by sandwiching the unit circle between two parallel halfplanes; in the geometry of circles, these are considered to be tangent to each other at the point at infinity. Each successive circle after these first two is tangent to the central unit circle and to the two most recently added circles; see the illustration for the first six circles (including the two halfplanes) constructed in this way. The first $n$ circles of this construction form a ring, whose minimum radius can be calculated by Descartes' theorem to be the same as the radius specified in the ring lemma. This construction can be perturbed to a ring of $n$ finite circles, without additional tangencies, whose minimum radius is arbitrarily close to this bound.

== History ==
A version of the ring lemma with a weaker bound was first proven by Burton Rodin and Dennis Sullivan as part of their proof of William Thurston's conjecture that circle packings can be used to approximate conformal maps. Lowell Hansen gave a recurrence relation for the tightest possible lower bound, and Dov Aharonov found a closed-form expression for the same bound.

== Applications ==
Beyond its original application to conformal mapping, the circle packing theorem and variants of the ring lemma play key roles in proofs by Malitz and Papakostas that planar graphs of bounded degree can be drawn with bounded angular resolution and by Keszegh, Pach, and Pálvölgyi that the same graphs can be drawn with bounded slope number.
