= David Minda =

American mathematician

Carl David Minda is an American mathematician, the Charles Phelps Taft Professor of Mathematics at the University of Cincinnati.

Minda did his undergraduate studies at the University of Cincinnati, earning a bachelor's degree in 1965 and a masters in 1966. He then earned his Ph.D. in 1970 from the University of California, San Diego, under the supervision of Burton Rodin. He taught at the University of Minnesota, and then returned to the Cincinnati faculty. He was given the Taft Professorship in 1999. His research falls within the branch of mathematics known as Complex Analysis. His research interests include structure of hyperbolic metric, Riemann surfaces, and geometric Schwarz-Pick lemma.

In 2001, Minda won the University of Cincinnati's Dolly Cohen Award for Excellence in Teaching, and in 2002, he won the distinguished teaching award of the Ohio section of the Mathematical Association of America.
