= Abraham Silvers =

American statistician (born 1934)

Abraham Silvers (born April 29, 1934) is an American mathematician and statistician who wrote extensively on research methods and approaches to clinical trials, medical studies and environmental risk assessment. Silvers received his PhD under the supervision of Leo Sario from the University of California, Los Angeles in 1964.

== Life and career ==
Silvers was born in Bronx, New York on April 29, 1934.

He was elected a Fellow of the American Statistical Association (ASA) in 1988 for his contributions to clinical trial and health risk assessment methodology, and in 1993, ASA awarded him a Distinguished Medal for his work in environmental statistics.

== Publications ==
He has co-authored and published over 100 articles including:

- 1964: Dissertation: Differential Geometric Methods in the Study of Mappings into Abstract Riemann Surfaces
- 1968: Insulin delivery rate into plasma in normal and diabetic subjects
- 1978: A prospective evaluation of the leukocyte adherence inhibition test in colorectal cancer and its correlation with carcinoembryonic antigen levels
- 1984: Pharmacokinetics in Low Dose Extrapolation Using Animal Cancer Data
- 1986: Proceedings : new directions on the extrapolation of health risks from animals to man
- 1998:Influence of Prenatal Mercury Exposure Upon Scholastic and Psychological Test Performance: Benchmark Analysis of a New Zealand Cohor
- 2009, Ian I. Mitroff and Abraham Silvers, Dirty Rotten Strategies: How We Trick Ourselves and Others into Solving the Wrong Problems Precisely, Stanford Business Press (2009), hardcover, 210 pages, ISBN 978-0-8047-5996-0
- 2010: New direction for enhancing quality in diabetes care: utilizing telecommunications and paraprofessional outreach workers backed by an expert medical team
