= Leo Sario =

Finnish-born mathematician

Leo R. Sario
- Born: 18 May 1916; Lieksa, Finland
- Died: 15 August 2009 (aged 93); Santa Monica, California
- Education: University of Helsinki
- Scientific career
- Fields: Mathematics
- Workplaces: University of California, Los Angeles
- Doctoral advisor: Rolf Nevanlinna
- Doctoral students: Burton Rodin; Abraham Silvers

Leo Reino Sario (18 May 1916 – 15 August 2009) was a Finnish-born mathematician who worked on complex analysis and Riemann surfaces.

== Early life and education ==
After service as a Finnish artillery officer in the Winter War and World War II, he received his PhD in 1948 under Rolf Nevanlinna at the University of Helsinki.

== Career ==
Nevanlinna and Sario were founding members of the Academy of Finland, and there is a statue on the academy grounds named after Sario. Sario moved to the United States in 1950 and obtained temporary positions at the Institute for Advanced Study, MIT, Stanford University, and Harvard University. In 1954 he became a professor at UCLA, remaining there until his retirement in 1986.

He was the author or co-author of five major books on complex analysis and over 130 papers. He supervised 36 doctoral students, including Kōtarō Oikawa and Burton Rodin.

== Awards and honors ==
In 1957 he was awarded the Cross of the Commander of Finland's Order of Knighthood. He was a Guggenheim Fellow for the academic year 1957–1958.

== Selected publications ==
- with Lars Ahlfors: Riemann surfaces, Princeton Mathematical Series 26, Princeton University Press 1960 2015 pbk reprint
- with Kiyoshi Noshiro: Value Distribution Theory, Van Nostrand 1966 2013 pbk reprint
- with Burton Rodin: Principal Functions, Springer 1968, Van Nostrand 1968; 2012 pbk reprint
- with Kōtarō Oikawa: Capacity Functions, Grundlehren der mathematischen Wissenschaften 149, Springer 1969
- with Mitsuru Nakai: Classification Theory of Riemann Surfaces, Grundlehren der mathematischen Wissenschaften 164, Springer 1970; 2012 pbk reprint
- with Mitsuru Nakai, Cecilia Wang, Lung Ock Chung: Classification Theory of Riemannian Manifolds : Harmonic, quasiharmonic and biharmonic functions, Lecture Notes in Mathematics 605, Springer 1977; 2006 pbk reprint
- Capacity of a boundary and of a boundary element, Annals of Mathematics, vol. 59, 1954, pp. 135–144 doi:10.2307/1969835
