= Sine-triple-angle circle =

Circle derived from a triangle

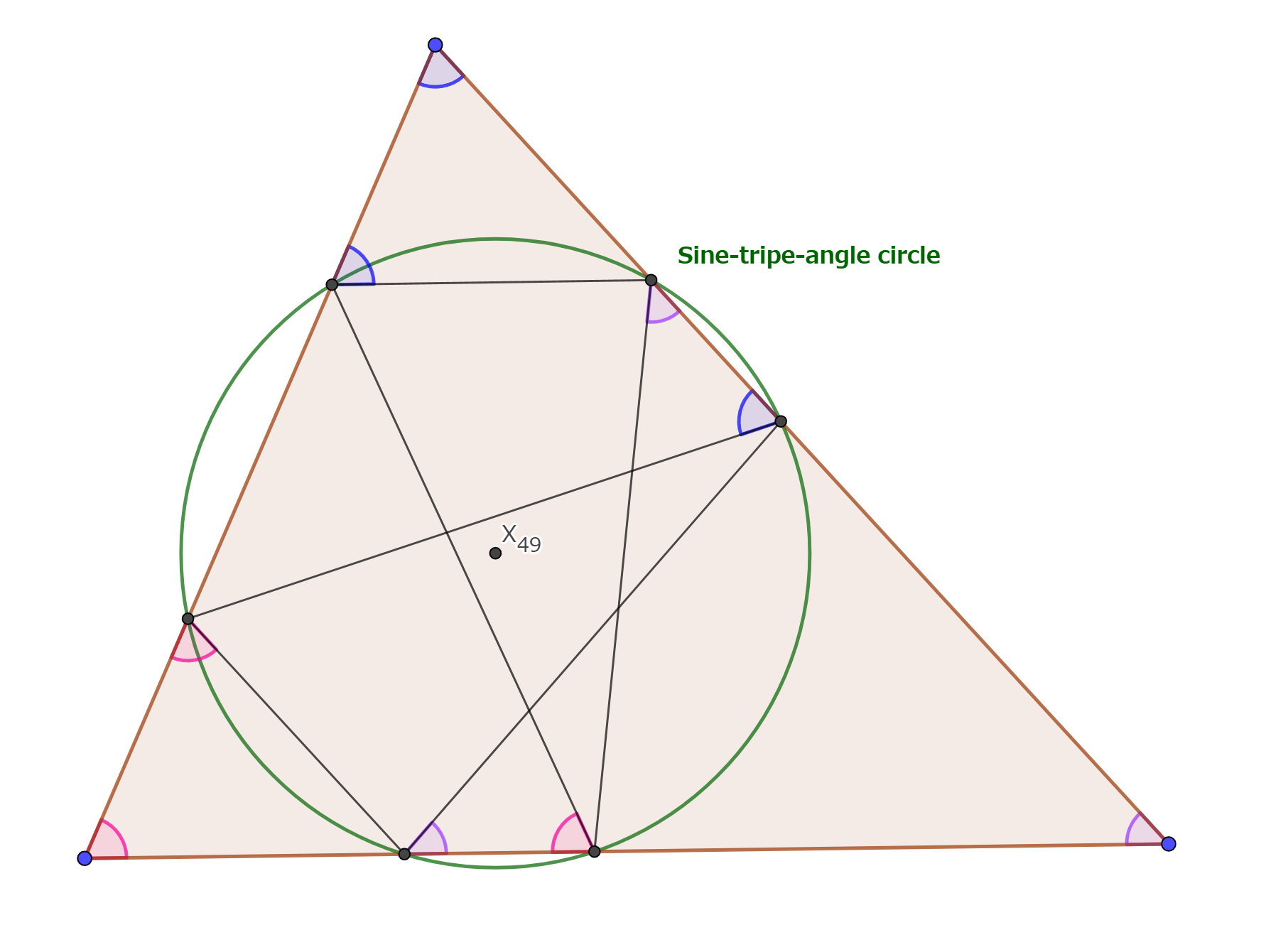
Sine-Triple-Angle Circle

In triangle geometry, the sine-triple-angle circle is one of many circles that can be defined from a triangle. For triangle ABC, let A_{1} and A_{2} be points on side BC , with B_{1}, B_{2}, C_{1} and C_{2} defined similarly on CA and AB respectively. If

$\angle A=\angle AB_1C_1=AC_2B_2,$

$\angle B=\angle BC_1A_1=BA_2C_2,$

and

$\angle C=\angle CA_1B_1=CB_2A_2,$

then A_{1}, A_{2}, B_{1}, B_{2}, C_{1} and C_{2} lie on a circle called the sine-triple-angle circle, originally referred to by Tucker and Neuberg as the cercle triplicateur.

== Properties ==
- $|A_1A_2|:|B_1B_2|:|C_1C_2|=\sin 3A:\sin 3B:\sin 3C$., which gives the circle its name. However, there are an uncountably infinite amount of circles that also satisfy this identity. The centers of these circles are on the hyperbola through the incenter, three excenters, and X(49) (see below for X_{49}).
- The homothetic centers of the Nine-point circle and the sine-triple-angle circle is the Kosnita point and the focus of the Kiepert parabola.
- The homothetic centers of the circumcircle and the sine-triple-angle circle is X(184), the inverse of Jerabek center in Brocard circle, and X(1147).
- Intersections of the Polar of A,B and C with the circle and BC,CA and AB are colinear.
- The radius of the sine-triple-angle circle is

$\frac{R}{|1+8\cos(A)\cos(B)\cos(C)|},$

where R is the circumradius of triangle ABC.

== Center ==
The center of sine-triple-angle circle is a triangle center designated as X(49) in Encyclopedia of Triangle Centers. with trilinear coordinates

$\cos(3A):\cos(3B):\cos(3C)$.

== Generalization ==
For a given natural number n>0, if

$\angle A_1C_1A_2=(2n-1)A-(n-1)\pi,$

$\angle B_1A_1B_2=(2n-1)B-(n-1)\pi,$

and

$\angle C_1B_1C_2=(2n-1)C-(n-1)\pi,$

then

$|A_1A_2|:|B_1B_2|:|C_1C_2|=\sin (2n-1)A:\sin (2n-1)B:\sin (2n-1)C$

and

A_{1}, A_{2}, B_{1}, B_{2}, C_{1} and C_{2} are concyclic. The sine-triple-angle circle is the special case where n=2.

== See also ==
- Taylor circle
- Tucker circle
- Triangle conic
- Triple angle
