= Burton Rodin =

American mathematician

- Education: University of California, Los Angeles
- Known for: Thurston conjecture for circle packings
- Awards: Fellow of the American Mathematical Society (2012)
- Scientific career
- Fields: Mathematics
- Workplaces: University of California, San Diego
- Thesis: Reproducing Formulas on Riemann Surfaces (1961)
- Doctoral advisor: Leo Sario

Burton Rodin is an American mathematician known for his research in conformal mappings and Riemann surfaces. He is a professor emeritus at the University of California, San Diego.

== Education ==
Rodin received a Ph.D. at the University of California, Los Angeles in 1961. His thesis, titled Reproducing Formulas on Riemann Surfaces, was written under the supervision of Leo Sario.

== Career ==
He was a professor at the University of California, San Diego from 1970 to 1994. He was chair of the Mathematics Department from 1977 to 1981, and became professor emeritus in June 1994.

== Research ==
Rodin's 1968 work on extremal length of Riemann surfaces, together with an observation of Mikhail Katz, yielded the first systolic geometry inequality for surfaces independent of their genus.

In 1980, Rodin and Stefan E. Warschawski solved the Visser–Ostrowski problem for derivatives of conformal mappings at the boundary. In 1987 he proved the Thurston conjecture for circle packings, jointly with Dennis Sullivan.

== Awards and honors ==
In 2012, Rodin was elected fellow of the American Mathematical Society.

== Selected books ==
- B. Rodin and L. Sario, Principal Functions, D. Van Nostrand Co., Princeton, N.J., 1968, 347 pages.
- B. Rodin, Calculus and Analytic Geometry, Prentice-Hall, Inc. Englewood Cliffs, N.J., 1970, 800 pages.
