= Welcome Aboard Toxic Airlines =

2007 British documentary about aerotoxic syndrome

- Theatrical poster
- Directed by: Tristan Loraine
- Written by: Tristan Loraine
- Produced by: Tristan Loraine
- Cinematography: Anna Carrington; Benjamin Foot; Trinity Greer; Robin Lambert; Lesley Pinder
- Edited by: Tristan Loraine; Mike Butler
- Music by: Kate Garbutt
- Distributed by: DFT Enterprises (UK)
- Release date: 30 November 2007
- Running time: 93 minutes
- Country: United Kingdom
- Language: English
- Budget: $400,000 (estimated)

Welcome Aboard Toxic Airlines is a 2007 British documentary film about aerotoxic syndrome directed and produced by former airline captain Tristan Loraine.

== Synopsis ==
This documentary shows that for nearly fifty years, airline passengers and crews have been supplied with unfiltered air, called bleed air, taken directly from the engines. It shows how pressure groups have stated that this air supply sometimes becomes contaminated with neurotoxins, carcinogens, and other hazardous chemicals. When this contamination occurs on an aeroplane, it is called a "fume event". Many fume events have been reported, some in which the passenger cabin was filled with smoke and fumes.

== Global Cabin Air Quality Executive ==
Former British Airways Captain Tristan Loraine, who produced the film, is co-chair of Global Cabin Air Quality Executive (GCAQE).

== Contrary opinions ==
Research by the UK government did not find a link to long-term health problems. The UK Parliament Select Committee on Science and Technology concluded in 2000 that the concerns about significant health risks were not substantiated.

In 2008 Michael Bagshaw, the former Head Doctor at British Airways, and later an advisor to Airbus, claimed that no peer-reviewed, recorded cases of neurological harm in humans followed low-level exposure to the organophosphate tricresyl phosphate (TCP), which is used as a lubricant in jet engines.

== See also ==
- Aerotoxic Association – Advocacy group
