= Tristan Loraine =

British filmmaker and former airline captain

- Born: 1962 (age 63–64)
- Education: National Film and Television School

Tristan Loraine is a British filmmaker, former commercial airline pilot, and aviation safety campaigner. His films frequently explore aviation history and aircraft cabin air safety, including the documentaries Welcome Aboard Toxic Airlines, Everybody Flies, American 965, and This Is Your Captain Speaking, as well as the fiction film A Dark Reflection.

He is the founder of the production company Fact Not Fiction Films.

== Early life and aviation career ==
Loraine developed an interest in aviation at the age of seven after watching the 1969 film The Battle of Britain. He began flying lessons at the age of 17, travelling long distances to an international airport to pursue his ambition of becoming a pilot. He later became a commercial airline pilot and served as a captain for British Airways. Loraine was eventually medically retired from flying due to ill health, which he attributed to exposure to contaminated cabin air during so-called "fume events," where engine oil leaks into the aircraft air supply system.

=== Campaigning on cabin air quality ===
Following his retirement, Loraine became a public campaigner on aircraft cabin air safety and a spokesperson for the Global Cabin Air Quality Executive (GCAQE). He argues that the common practice of supplying cabin air from engine "bleed air" systems can allow engine oil contaminants, including tricresyl phosphate (TCP), to enter the aircraft cabin.

His claims have been reported by the BBC, Telegraph and Tambay Bay 28. Regulators and industry bodies, including the CAA, IATA and Boeing, have stated that existing research shows cabin air meets health and safety standards and that no causal link to long-term illness has been established.

Loraine's work references recommendations from air accident investigation bodies calling for improved monitoring of cabin air, and he has highlighted the Boeing 787 as an example of an aircraft that does not use engine bleed air for cabin ventilation.

In 2015, Loraine received a British Citizen Award at the House of Lords for services to industry related to his research and campaigning.

== Filmmaking career ==
After leaving aviation, Loraine trained at the National Film and Television School. In November 2006, he founded Fact Not Fiction Films. His first documentary, Welcome Aboard Toxic Airlines, investigated claims of contaminated cabin air. The film screened in UK cinemas in 2008.

In 2012, he directed Shady Lady, a World War II aviation docudrama about a B-24 bombing mission from Australia to Borneo, widely regarded as one of the longest bombing missions undertaken at that time.

In 2014, Loraine later wrote, directed, produced and edited the fiction thriller A Dark Reflection, inspired by his experiences and concerns about cabin air safety. The film premiered at the Cannes market and starred Georgina Sutcliffe and Marina Sirtis. Earlier reports on The Hollywood Reporter show the project was originally developed under the title Shadows From the Sky, based on Loraine's novel Toxic Airlines.

In 2019, he co-directed the documentary Everybody Flies with Beth Moran. The film premiered at the Raindance Film Festival and examines the issue of aerotoxic syndrome and cabin air contamination.

In 2021, he directed investigative documentary American 965, which examines the 1995 crash of American Airlines Flight 965 and questions whether contaminated cabin air was considered during the investigation.

In 2025, Loraine directed the documentaries This Is Your Captain Speaking and Our Journey with Lobular Breast Cancer, both of which premiered at Raindance Film Festival. The former focusing on aircraft cabin air safety and the latter examining the campaign for research into lobular breast cancer.

== Other activities ==
Loraine is a co-founder of the Lobular Moon Shot Project, a United Kingdom–based campaign advocating for dedicated research into lobular breast cancer. His wife, Susan Michaelis, was diagnosed with lobular breast cancer in 2013 and lived with the disease for more than a decade. Following estimates that £20 million would be required to fund targeted research into lobular breast cancer, Loraine and Michaelis co-founded the initiative and campaigned for government support. The campaign has received cross-party political support in the United Kingdom, including backing from several hundred Members of Parliament, and has engaged with health officials and policymakers to promote increased investment in lobular breast cancer research.

== Personal life ==
Loraine was married to Susan Michaelis, an Australian-trained pilot, academic, and cancer campaigner. Michaelis was diagnosed with lobular breast cancer in 2013 and later became a prominent advocate for research into the disease. She died in 2025 after living with the illness for more than twelve years.
