= Air cycle machine =

Aircraft refrigeration

An air cycle machine (ACM) is the refrigeration unit of the environmental control system (ECS) used in pressurized gas-turbine–powered aircraft. Normally an aircraft has two or three of these ACM. Each ACM and various associated components and pipework are often referred as an air conditioning pack. The air cycle cooling process uses air instead of a phase changing material such as freon in the gas cycle. No condensation or evaporation of a refrigerant is involved, and the cooled air output from the process is used directly for cabin ventilation or for cooling electronic equipment.

== History ==
Air cycle machines were first developed in the 19th century for providing chilling on ships. The technique is a reverse Brayton cycle (the thermodynamic cycle of a gas turbine engine) and is also known as a Bell Coleman cycle or "Air-Standard Refrigeration Cycle".

== Technical details ==
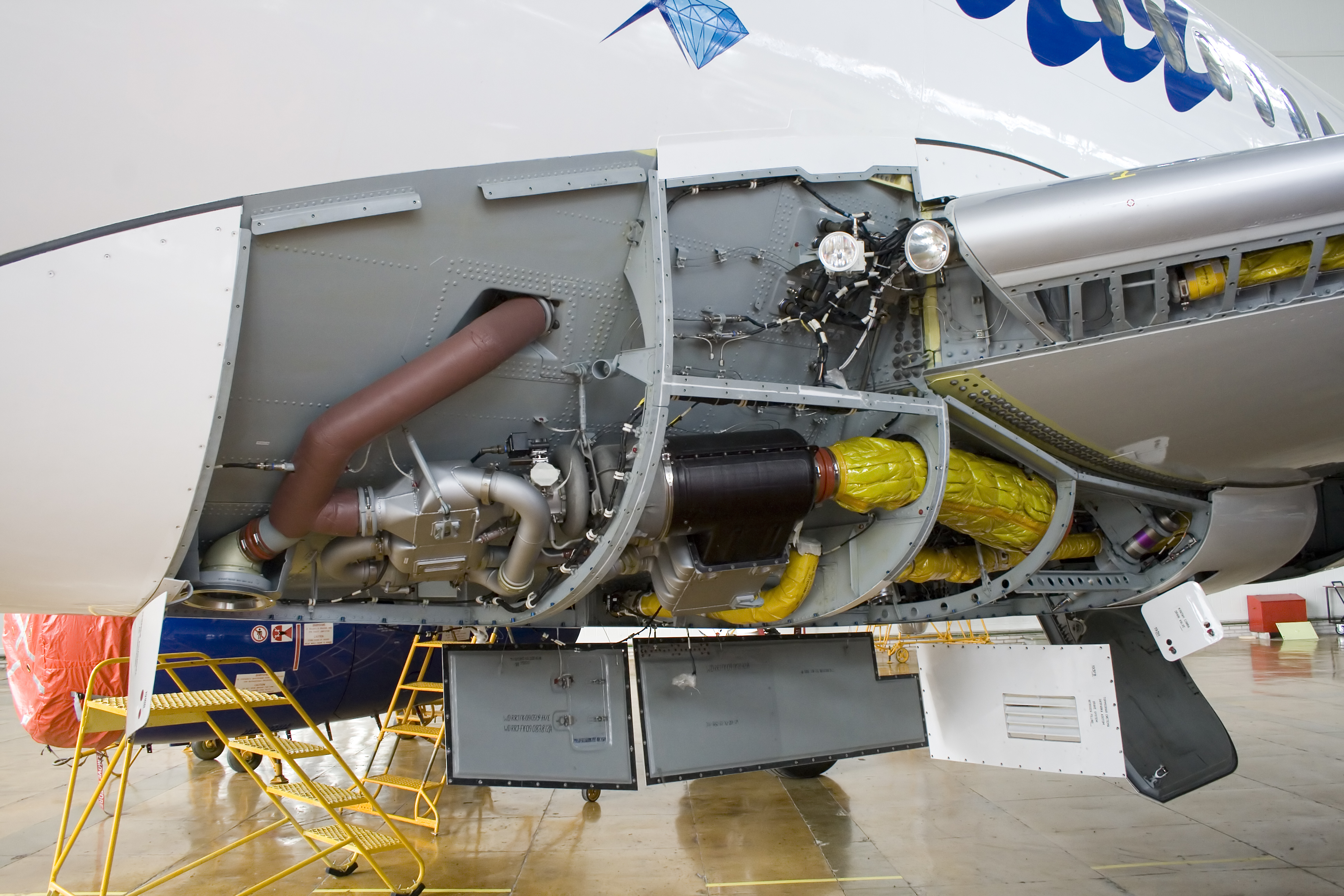
The air cycle machine aboard a Sukhoi Superjet 100

The usual compression, cooling and expansion seen in any refrigeration cycle is accomplished in the ACM by a centrifugal compressor, two air-to-air heat exchangers and an expansion turbine.

Bleed air from the engines, an auxiliary power unit, or a ground source, which can be in excess of 150 °C and at a pressure of perhaps 32 psi (220 kPa), is directed into a primary heat exchanger. Outside air at ambient temperature and pressure is used as the coolant in this air-to-air heat exchanger. Once the hot air has been cooled, it is then compressed by the centrifugal compressor. This compression increases the temperature of the air (the maximum at this point is about 250 °C) and it is sent to the secondary heat exchanger, which again uses outside air as the coolant. The pre-cooling through the first heat exchanger increases the efficiency of the ACM because it lowers the temperature of the air entering the compressor, so that less work is required to compress a given air mass (the energy required to compress a gas by a given ratio rises as the temperature of the incoming gas rises).

At this point, the temperature of the compressed cooled air is somewhat greater than the ambient temperature of the outside air. The compressed, cooled air then travels through the expansion turbine, which extracts heat from the air as it expands, cooling it to below ambient temperature (down to −20 °C or −30 °C). It is possible for the ACM to produce air cooled to less than 0 °C even when outside air temperature is high (as might be experienced with the aircraft stationary on the ground in a hot climate). The work extracted by the expansion turbine is transmitted by a shaft to spin the pack's centrifugal compressor and an inlet fan which draws in the external air for the heat exchangers during ground running; ram air is used in flight. The power for the air conditioning pack comes from the reduction of the pressure of the incoming bleed air relative to that of the cooled air exiting the system; typical differentials are from about 30 psi (210 kPa) to about 11 psi (76 kPa).

The next step is to dehumidify the air. Cooling the air has caused any water vapor it contains to condense into fog, which can be removed using a cyclonic separator. Historically, the water extracted by the separator was simply dumped overboard, but newer ACMs spray the water into the outside-air intakes for each heat exchanger, which gives the coolant a greater heat capacity and improves efficiency. (It also means that running the ACM on an airplane parked on the tarmac does not leave a puddle.)

The air can then be combined in a mixing chamber with a small amount of non-conditioned engine bleed air. This warms the air to the desired temperature, and then the air is vented into the cabin or to electronic equipment.

== Manufacturers ==
Major manufacturers of ACMs are Honeywell Aerospace, Liebherr Aerospace, Collins Aerospace, and PBS Velka Bites.

== Nomenclature ==
=== Types ===
The types of air cycle machines may be identified as:

- Simple cycle, consisting of a turbine and fan on a common shaft
- Two-wheel bootstrap, consisting of a turbine and compressor on a common shaft
- Three-wheel, consisting of a turbine, compressor, and fan on a common shaft
- Four-wheel/dual-spool, consisting of two turbines, a compressor, and a fan on a common shaft

=== Abbreviations ===
The equipment is referred to variously as PAC, air conditioning pack, or A/C pack, but there is a lack of consistency and agreement as to the derivations and meanings:

- Pack. as an abbreviation of package, applied to both pneumatic and non-pneumatic systems (Boeing, Airbus, Embraer, Bombardier and Lockheed)
- PAC as an acronym meaning either passenger air conditioning or pneumatic air conditioning (the latter being found on systems control panels of at least one business jet supplier)
- PACK as an acronym for pneumatic air cycle kit or pressurization & air conditioning kit

== See also ==
- Brayton cycle
- Refrigeration
- Aerotoxic syndrome
