= Fume event =

Aircraft cabin air contamination

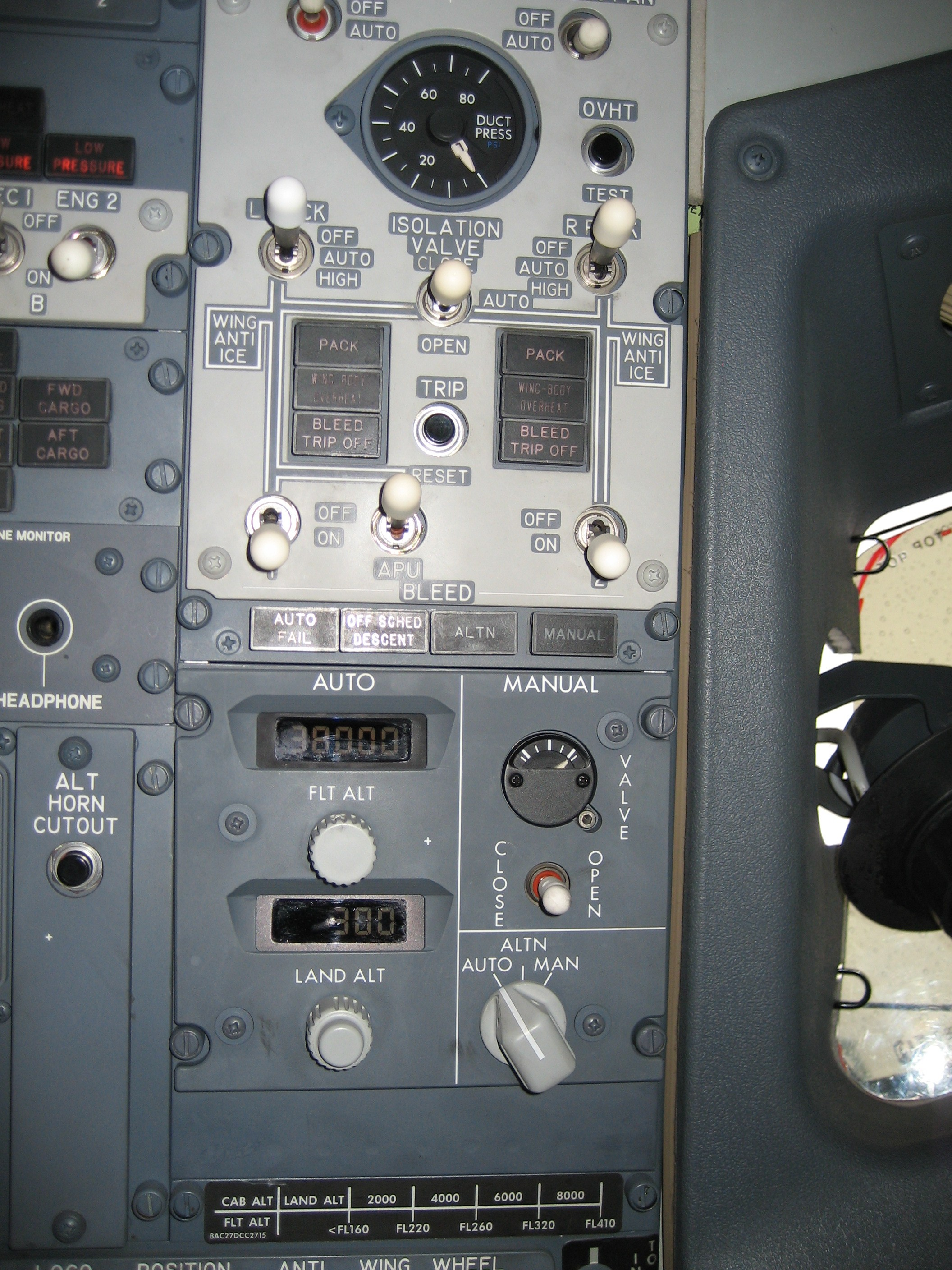
The control panel that controls cabin pressurisation and bleed air distribution on a Boeing 737-800

A fume event occurs when bleed air used for cabin pressurisation and air conditioning in a pressurised aircraft is contaminated by fluids such as engine oil, hydraulic fluid, anti-icing fluid, and other potentially hazardous chemicals.

== How cabin pressurisation works ==
Because airliners fly at very high altitudes, the cabin must be pressurised to provide a safe quantity of breathable oxygen to passengers and crew. The cabin is pressurised with bleed air tapped from the jet engine's compressor sections, which are prior to the combustion sections. Bleed air is very hot and must be cooled by heat exchangers before it is directed into the air conditioning units, which cool it even further.

The Boeing 787 uses electrically driven compressors to pressurise its cabin instead of engine bleed air, reducing the risk of bleed-air fume events.

== Handling of fume events ==
In the event of fumes or smoke in an aircraft, flight deck crew will wear pressurised oxygen masks in order to avoid breathing in irritating fumes. Goggles are also available if necessary. Cabin crew may be able to use portable oxygen masks if they identify the fume event in time. If the fumes do not subside after an attempt is made to diagnose and fix the problem, the flight is diverted to a nearby airport. In a severe fume or smoke event, the aircraft might descend to an altitude of 10,000 feet (3,000 m) or lower where it can safely be depressurised.

An FAA-funded study found that fume events occur on 1 in 5,000 flights; some planes may have multiple consecutive events if the leak is not fixed. Sensors that can detect air quality issues are available and the airline Lufthansa has requested their installation, but Boeing declined due to fear of litigation from crew or passengers sickened by detectable fume events. The British Aerospace 146 was particularly susceptible to apparent fume events.

A Wall Street Journal investigation found that the Airbus A320 has been the aircraft most affected by fume events.

== Health effects ==
The human physiological effects of fume events are yet to be fully understood by the medical community. Signs and symptoms of exposure can be misdiagnosed as other common ailments, due particularly to the delay between exposure to fumes and the onset of associated symptoms. While most aeromedical professionals believe no long-term health effects exist from fume events, some consumer and aircrew advocacy groups claim that it can cause a medically-unrecognised condition called aerotoxic syndrome.

Turbine engine oil is an irritant and contains neurotoxic chemicals such as tricresyl phosphate. The aviation industry claims that engine oil does not contain sufficient quantities of such chemicals to cause long-term damage. However, there is some historical evidence that would seem to contradict this statement; in 1959, over 10,000 people in Morocco were paralyzed or otherwise adversely affected after ingesting small quantities of tricresyl phosphate in their cooking oil.

Hydraulic fluid, although non-toxic in small quantities, is extremely irritating to the eyes and skin, which creates a hazard to pilots during a fume event but causes no lasting damage.

Deicing fluid has a strong smell but is not very irritating or toxic if inhaled (though it has significant toxicity when ingested).

It is not mandatory for fume events to be reported in the U.S.

Many lobbying groups have been set up to advocate for research into this hazard, including the Aviation Organophosphate Information Site (AOPIS) (2001), the Global Cabin Air Quality Executive (2006), and the UK-based Aerotoxic Association (2007). Cabin Environment Research is one of many functions of the ACER Group, but their researchers have not yet established any causal relationship.

Although a study made for the EU in 2014 confirmed that contamination of cabin air could be a problem, the study also stated:

"A lot of reported fume events caused comfort limitations for the occupants but posed no danger. A verification of cabin air contamination with toxic substances (e.g. TCP/TOCP) was not possible with the fume events the BFU investigated."

While no scientific evidence to date has found that airliner cabin air has been contaminated to toxic levels (exceeding known safe levels, in ppm, of any dangerous chemical), in March 2010 a court in Australia in ruled in favor of a former airline flight attendant who claimed she suffered chronic respiratory problems after being exposed to oil fumes on a flight in March 1992. Such testing is infrequent due to Boeing's refusal to install air quality sensors in its planes, fearing litigation from passengers or crew over fume events. In the U.S., airlines refused to allow flight attendants to carry air samplers after Congress mandated chemical measurements.

The FAA has revoked the medical certificates of several pilots who developed neurological issues after fume events.

A Los Angeles Times analysis of NASA safety reports from January 2018 to December 2019 identified 362 voluntarily-reported fume events, in which almost 400 pilots, flight attendants and passengers received medical attention. On 73 or more of those flights, pilots used emergency oxygen. Four dozen pilots were impaired so far as to be unable to perform their duties. Boeing told the Times that they believe no credible data shows that oil leaks into the bleed air stream can cause serious injuries. By contrast, a judge who awarded workers' compensation to a pilot who had suffered toxic encephalopathy (brain damage) from a fume event condemned the airline industry's obstructionism around fume events.

== See also ==
- Aerotoxic syndrome – Health effects associated with contaminated aeroplane cabin air
- Standards and Recommended Practices – International aviation specifications
- Welcome Aboard Toxic Airlines – 2007 British documentary about aerotoxic syndrome
