= Susan Michaelis =

Susan Michaelis was a former Australian flight instructor and airline transport pilot. She is also a researcher working on the issue of contaminated air on aircraft and the health effects of exposure to heated jet engine oils and hydraulic fluids known to contaminate the breathing air supply on aircraft, often called aerotoxic syndrome. She is a part of the University of Stirling's Occupational and Environmental Health Research group, where she is an Honorary Sensor Research Fellow.

== Early life and education ==
Michaelis was born in Melbourne, Australia, and attended Lauriston Girls' School. In 1986, she received her Bachelor of Business (Marketing) from the Chisholm Institute of Technology before moving on to train as an airline pilot.

Michaelis obtained a Ph.D. in Safety Science in 2010 from the University of New South Wales. Her thesis addressed health and flight safety implications of exposure to aircraft contaminated air.

In 2016, she qualified as an air accident investigator and obtained an MSc at Cranfield University in "Air Safety and Accident Investigation". Her thesis addressed how oil leaks past seals in turbine engines.

Michaelis also holds National Examination Board in Occupational Safety and Health and COSHH qualifications in health and safety and the use of hazardous substances.

In 1999, along with Ansett Australia flight attendant, Judy Cullinane, she helped initiate the 1999 Australian Senate Rural and Regional Affairs and Transport References Committee inquiry into contaminated air on aircraft.

Michaelis has completed two half ironman triathlon events.

== Career as a pilot ==
Michaelis initially worked as a flight instructor at Southern Air Services at Moorabbin Airport in Melbourne before working in the Northern Territory flying single and multi-crew commercial flights across the top end of Australia for Air North and Lloyd Aviation on twin Cessna and Embraer EMB 110 Bandeirante aircraft.

In 1991, she joined Eastern Australia Airlines, and was the first officer on a British Aerospace Jetstream 31 flight from Sydney to Newcastle that later became the first all-female-crewed flight for the Qantas group.

In 1994, she began flying the British Aerospace BAe 146 until 1997, when she retired due to ill health after repeated exposure to contaminated air on the aircraft she flew.

== Career as a researcher ==
In 2006, she was appointed Head of Research for the not-for-profit Global Cabin Air Quality Executive and in 2007 published the Aviation Contaminated Air Reference Manual.

Michaelis sits on numerous committees dealing with the topic of contaminated air such as the European Committee for Standardization Committee TC436, SAE International SAE-E31, and AC-9 committees.

She is regularly asked to speak at international conferences on the topic of aircraft contaminated air, and has published many peer-reviewed papers.

She is also a member of the Institution of Occupational Safety and Health and the International Institute of Risk and Safety Management.

Michaelis is featured in three documentaries: Flying Sheilas (2007), Angel without Wings (2010), and Broken Wings (2011).

== Lobular breast cancer advocacy ==
Michaelis was diagnosed with invasive lobular breast cancer in 2013. She subsequently founded the Lobular Moon Shot Project in 2023, a campaign calling for increased research into the disease and £20 million in government funding for a five-year research programme.

In 2023, Harkness Roses introduced the 'Dr. Susan Michaelis' rose at the RHS Chelsea Flower Show. The hybrid tea rose was bred by Philip Harkness and named after Michaelis. A portion of the proceeds from sales was designated to support research into invasive lobular breast cancer.

Michaelis campaigned for the proposed research programme through parliamentary events and meetings with politicians. She died on 9 July 2025. Following her death, the campaign continued under the management of her husband, Tristan Loraine.

== Awards ==
In 1987, she was awarded the Civil Aviation Safety Authority Sir Donald Anderson Trophy for Academic Merit when she qualified as a commercial pilot.

In 2017, she was awarded the Cranfield University Course Director's Prize for her work on her MSc Implementation Of The Requirements For The Provision Of Clean Air In Crew And Passenger Compartments Using The Aircraft Bleed Air System.

In 2018, she was awarded the Global Cabin Air Quality Executive annual Flight Safety Award.

In 2023, she was awarded a British Citizen Awards, the first Australian to receive the award.

== Death ==
Michaelis died in hospital on 9 July 2025, aged 62, with her husband Tristan Loraine and close friends present. She was wearing a Lobular Moon Shot Project T-shirt at the time of her death.

In June 2026, the National Portrait Gallery acquired a photograph of Michaelis taken by Tegan Grace Muggeridge on 24 June 2025, shortly before her death. The photograph depicts Michaelis during a BBC radio interview ahead of a Lobular Moon Shot Project silent vigil in London.

In 9 July 2026, a Westminster Hall debate on government support for the Lobular Moon Shot Project was subsequently held in her memory.
