= Fact Not Fiction Films =

British film production company

- Industry: Motion picture
- Genre: Independent; International
- Founded: 2006; 20 years ago
- Founder: Tristan Loraine
- Website: www.factnotfictionfilms.com

Fact Not Fiction Films is a UK-based independent film and documentary production company founded in 2006 by filmmaker and former airline captain Tristan Loraine. The company produces documentaries, feature films and short films, frequently focusing on public interest subjects including aviation safety, health, and mental health awareness.

== History ==
Fact Not Fiction Films was established in late 2006 following Loraine’s retirement from aviation. The company’s first major project was the investigative documentary Welcome Aboard Toxic Airlines, a 93-minute film examining claims that aircraft cabin air could expose passengers and crew to hazardous chemicals. The film later had a UK DVD release and cinema screenings.

Early development projects announced by the company included the feature adaptation Shadows From The Sky (based on Loraine’s novel Toxic Airlines), the documentary Flying Sheilas about Australian female pilots, and the political thriller 31 North 62 East.

== Feature film production ==
In 2008, Fact Not Fiction Films produced the independently financed political thriller 31 North 62 East, filmed in the UK and Jordan with a reported $2 million budget. The film was produced and directed by Loraine, with cinematography by Sue Gibson, and featured a cast including John Rhys-Davies, Marina Sirtis, Heather Peace and Craig Fairbrass.

The company later produced aviation-themed feature and docudrama work including Shady Lady and A Dark Reflection.

== Documentary production ==
Fact Not Fiction Film debut film Welcome Aboard Toxic Airlines investigated aircraft cabin air safety.

In 2019, Fact Not Fiction Films released Everybody Flies, examining aerotoxic syndrome and aircraft cabin air contamination.

In 2025, the company premiered the documentary Our Journey With Lobular Breast Cancer at the Raindance Film Festival, focusing on the Lobular Moon Shot Project and research into lobular breast cancer. In the same year, the company also premiered This Is Your Captain Speaking, which examined aviation safety and pilot wellbeing.

== Short films and charity partnerships ==
Fact Not Fiction Films has produced a number of issue-led short films in partnership with charities. These include Missing a Note (2019), which raised awareness of dementia, received a theatrical release with Everyman Cinemas and was submitted for Academy Award consideration, and Finding Wilson (2020), produced in partnership with The Lucy Rayner Foundation, which addressed mental health and PTSD and was filmed in West Sussex.

In 2023, the company released the short film Angel Fleet, which follows two sisters and their mother as they cope with the death of their father in a gliding accident. The film premiered on 27 April 2023 at the Capitol Theatre in Horsham, England, was filmed primarily in West Sussex, and was also submitted for Academy Award consideration.

In 2025, the company announced the short A Girl Called Alice, which entered pre-production with filming planned to take place on location in London. The film addresses mobile phone theft and related scams in the United Kingdom. The film is produced and directed by Tristan Loraine, with Freya Marley serving as assistant producer.
