= Our Journey with Lobular Breast Cancer =

2025 British documentary film

- Directed by: Tristan Loraine
- Written by: Tristan Loraine
- Produced by: Tristan Loraine
- Cinematography: Ed White
- Music by: Ian Livingstone
- Production company: Fact Not Fiction Films
- Release date: June 24, 2025 (Raindance)
- Country: United Kingdom
- Language: English

Our Journey with Lobular Breast Cancer is a 2025 British documentary film directed by Tristan Loraine released by Fact Not Fiction Films. The film follows individuals affected by invasive lobular breast cancer (ILC) and documents campaigning activity associated with the Lobular Moon Shot Project. The film premiered at the 33rd Raindance Film Festival in London on 24 June 2025.

== Synopsis ==
The documentary centres on Dr Susan Michaelis and other participants affected by invasive lobular breast cancer. It presents personal accounts alongside documentation of campaign activity in the United Kingdom seeking increased research attention for invasive lobular carcinoma.

== Production ==
In interviews, director Tristan Loraine stated that the film developed alongside related campaign activity and was intended to document both lived experience and engagement with policymakers.

== Release ==
The film premiered at the 33rd Raindance Film Festival on 24 June 2025 and was subsequently screened at additional UK venues and festivals.

== Reception ==
A review in DMovies described the documentary as combining personal testimony with advocacy concerning research funding for invasive lobular breast cancer.
