= Environmental control system =

Aircraft system which maintains internal pressurization, climate, air supply, and more

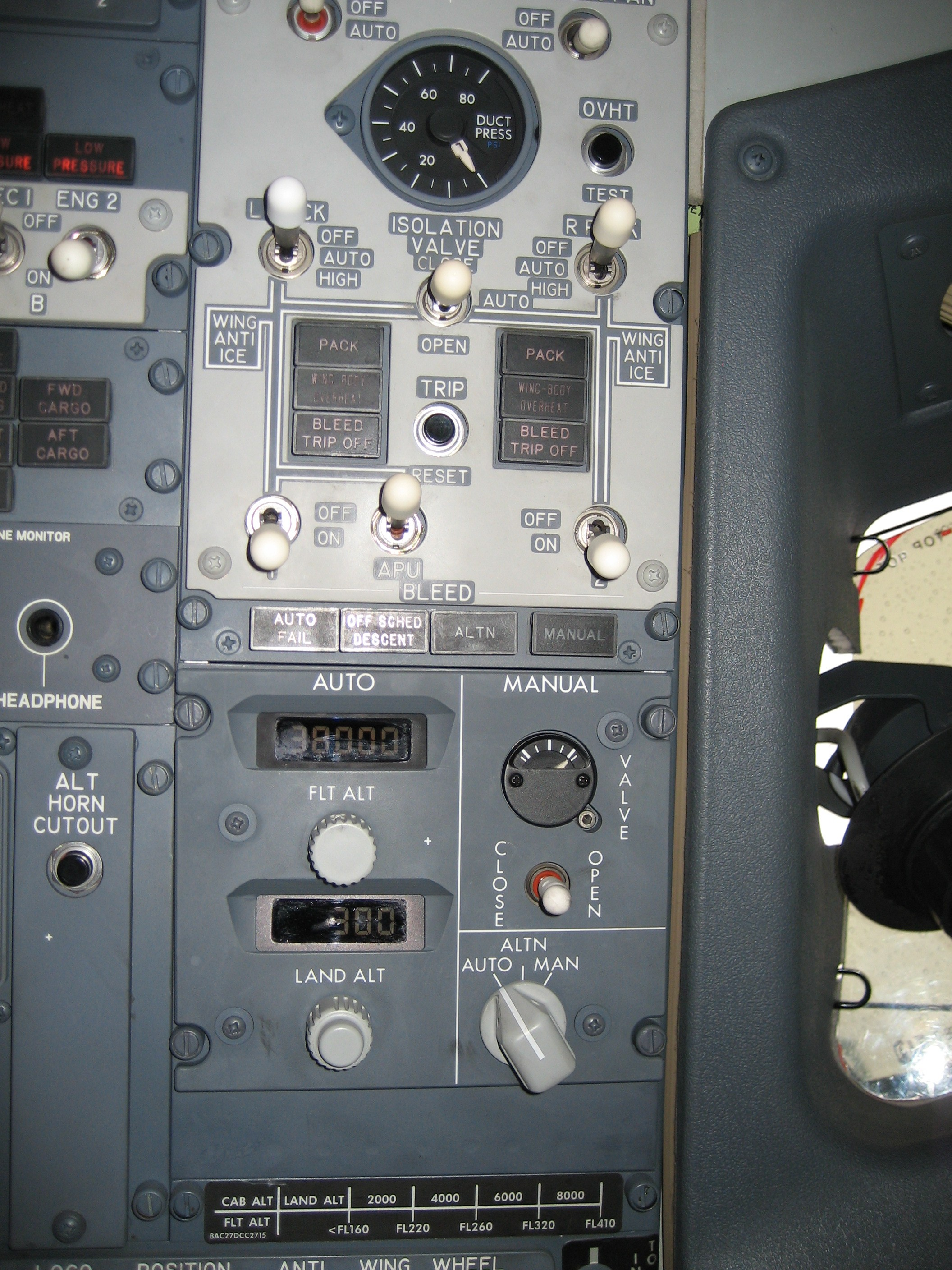
Control panel for a Boeing 737-800 ECS

In aeronautics, an environmental control system (ECS) of an aircraft is an essential component which provides air supply, thermal control and cabin pressurization for the crew and passengers. Additional functions include the cooling of avionics, smoke detection, and fire suppression.

== Overview ==
The systems described below are specific to current production Boeing airliners, although the details are essentially identical for passenger jets from Airbus and other companies. An exception was Concorde which had a supplementary air supply system fitted due to the higher altitudes at which it flew, and also the slightly higher cabin pressure it employed.

== Air supply ==
Environmental control system (ECS) schematic of Boeing 737-300

On jetliners, air is supplied to the ECS by being bled from a compressor stage of each gas turbine engine, upstream of the combustor. The temperature and pressure of this bleed air varies according to which compressor stage is used, and the power setting of the engine. A manifold pressure regulating shut-off valve (MPRSOV) restricts the flow as necessary to maintain the desired pressure for downstream systems.

A certain minimum supply pressure is needed to drive the air through the system, but it is desired to use as low a supply pressure as possible, because the energy the engine uses to compress the bleed air is not available for propulsion, and fuel consumption suffers. For this reason, air is commonly drawn from one of two (or in some cases such as the Boeing 777, three) bleed ports at different compressor stage locations. When the engine is at low pressure (low thrust or high altitude), the air is drawn from the highest pressure bleed port. As pressure is increased (more thrust or lower altitude) and reaches a predetermined crossover point, the high pressure shut-off valve (HPSOV) closes and air is selected from a lower pressure port to minimize the fuel performance loss. The reverse happens as engine pressure decreases.

To achieve the desired temperature, the bleed-air is passed through a heat exchanger called a pre-cooler. Air bled from the engine fan is blown across the pre-cooler, located in the engine strut, and absorbs excess heat from the service bleed air. A fan air modulating valve (FAMV) varies the cooling airflow to control the final air temperature of the service bleed air.

Notably, the Boeing 787 does not use bleed air to pressurize the cabin. The aircraft instead draws air from dedicated inlets, located ahead of the wings.

== Cold air unit ==
The primary component of the cold air unit (CAU) is the air cycle machine (ACM) cooling device. An ACM uses no freon or other condensing-boiling substance; the air itself is the refrigerant, and does not change phase. The ACM is preferred over vapor cycle devices because of reduced weight and maintenance requirements. Some aircraft are exceptions, including early Boeing 707 aircraft, which used vapor-compression refrigeration like that in home air conditioners.

Most jetliners are equipped with PACKs, with the location depending on the design of the aircraft. In some designs, they are installed in the wing-to-body fairing between the two wings beneath the fuselage. On other aircraft (Douglas Aircraft DC-9 Series) the AC PACKs are located in the tail. The aircraft PACKs on the McDonnell Douglas DC-10/MD-11 and Lockheed L-1011 are located in the front of the aircraft beneath the flight deck. Nearly all jetliners have two PACKs, although larger aircraft such as the Boeing 747, Lockheed L-1011, and McDonnell-Douglas DC-10/MD-11 have three.

The quantity of bleed air flowing to the AC pack is regulated by the flow control valve (FCV). One FCV is installed for each PACK. A normally closed isolation valve prevents air from the left bleed system from reaching the right PACK (and vice versa), although this valve may be opened in the event of loss of one bleed system.

Downstream of the FCV is the cold-air unit (CAU), also referred to as the refrigeration unit. There are many various types of CAUs; however, they all use typical fundamentals. The bleed air enters the primary ram-air heat exchanger, where it is cooled by either ram air, expansion or a combination of both. The cold air then enters the compressor, where it is repressurized, which reheats the air. A pass through the secondary ram-air heat exchanger cools the air while maintaining the high pressure. The air then passes through a turbine which expands the air to further reduce heat. Similar in operation to a turbo-charger unit, the compressor and turbine are on a single shaft. The energy extracted from the air passing through the turbine is used to power the compressor. The air flow then is directed to the reheater before it passes to the condenser to be ready for water extraction by water extractor.

The air is then sent through a water separator, where the air is forced to spiral along its length and centrifugal forces cause the moisture to be flung through a sieve and toward the outer walls where it is channeled toward a drain and sent overboard. Then, the air usually will pass through a water separator coalescer or the sock. The sock retains the dirt and oil from the engine bleed air to keep the cabin air cleaner. This water removal process prevents ice from forming and clogging the system, and keeps the cockpit and cabin from fogging on ground operation and low altitudes.

For a sub-zero bootstrap CAU, the moisture is extracted before it reaches the turbine so that sub-zero temperatures may be reached.

The temperature of the PACK outlet air is controlled by the adjusting flow through the ram-air system (below), and modulating a temperature control valve (TCV) which bypasses a portion of the hot bleed air around the ACM and mixes it with the cold air downstream of the ACM turbine.

== Ram air system ==
The ram-air inlet is a small scoop, generally located on the wing-to-body fairing. Nearly all jetliners use a modulating door on the ram-air inlet to control the amount of cooling airflow through the primary and secondary ram air heat exchangers.

To increase ram-air recovery, nearly all jetliners use modulating vanes on the ram-air exhaust. A ram-air fan within the ram system provides ram-air flow across the heat exchangers when the aircraft is on the ground. Nearly all modern fixed-wing aircraft use a fan on a common shaft with the ACM, powered by the ACM turbine.

== Air distribution ==
The AC PACK exhaust air is ducted into the pressurized fuselage, where it is mixed with filtered air from the recirculation fans, and fed into the mix manifold. On nearly all modern jetliners, the airflow is approximately 50% outside air and 50% filtered air.

Modern jetliners use high-efficiency particulate arresting HEPA filters, which trap more than 99% of all bacteria and clustered viruses.

Air from the mix manifold is directed to overhead distribution nozzles in the various zones of the aircraft. Temperature in each zone may be adjusted by adding small amounts of trim air, which is low-pressure, high-temperature air tapped off the AC PACK upstream of the TCV. Air is also supplied to individual gasper vents. (Note: Gaspers are small, circular vents above each passenger seat that can be adjusted by passengers for their personal comfort.) A revolving control on the vent can be turned to adjust ventilation between no air output at all and a fairly substantial breeze.

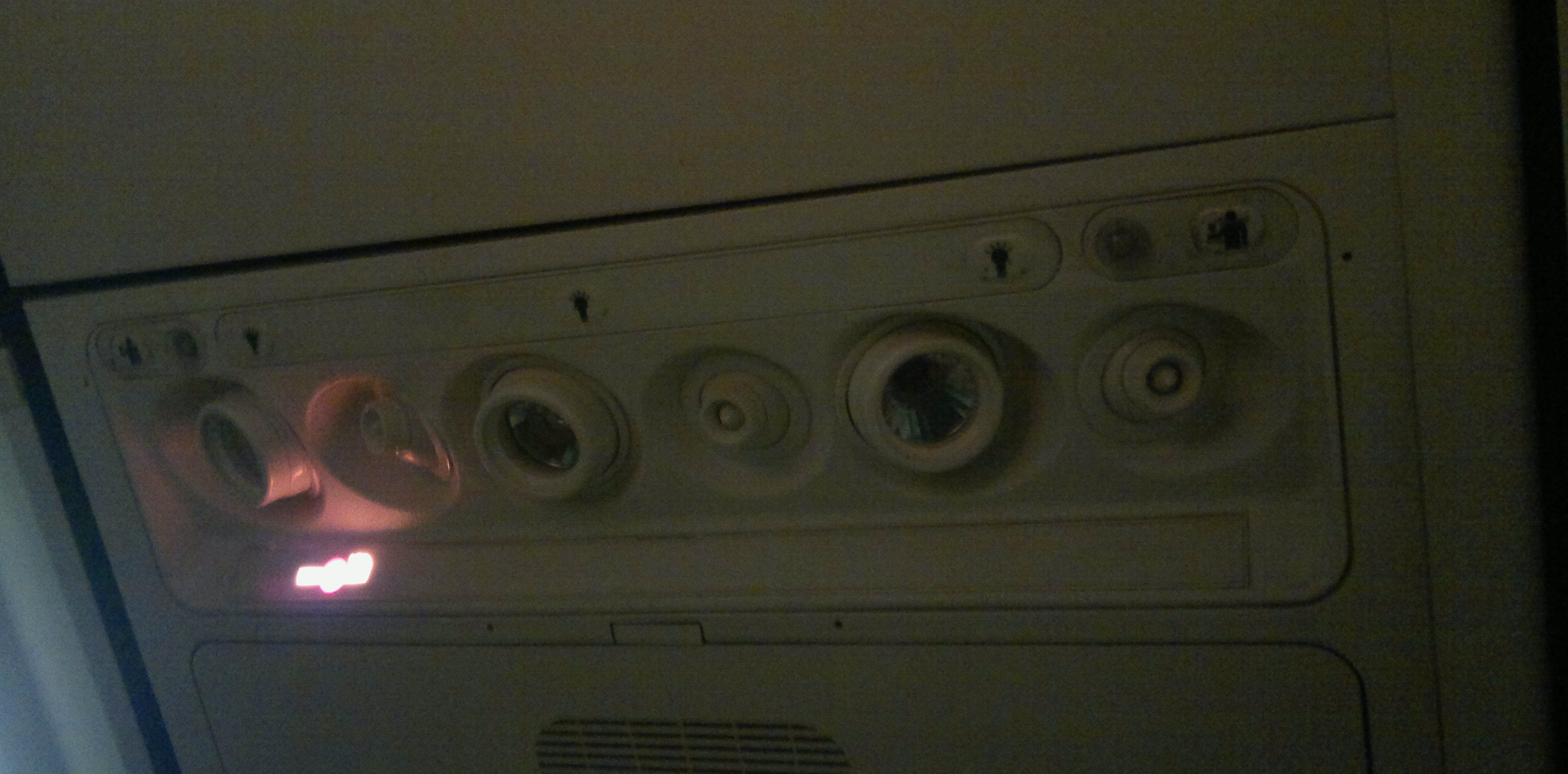
Gasper vent over passenger seats of a Boeing 737-800

Gaspers usually receive their air from the AC PACKs aboard the aircraft, which in turn receive compressed, clean air from the compressor stages of the aircraft's jet engines or when on the ground from the auxiliary power unit (APU) or a ground source. A master control for gaspers is located in the cockpit; gaspers are often temporarily turned off during certain phases of flight (e.g. during take-off and climb) when the load on the engines from bleed-air demands must be minimized.

== Pressurization ==
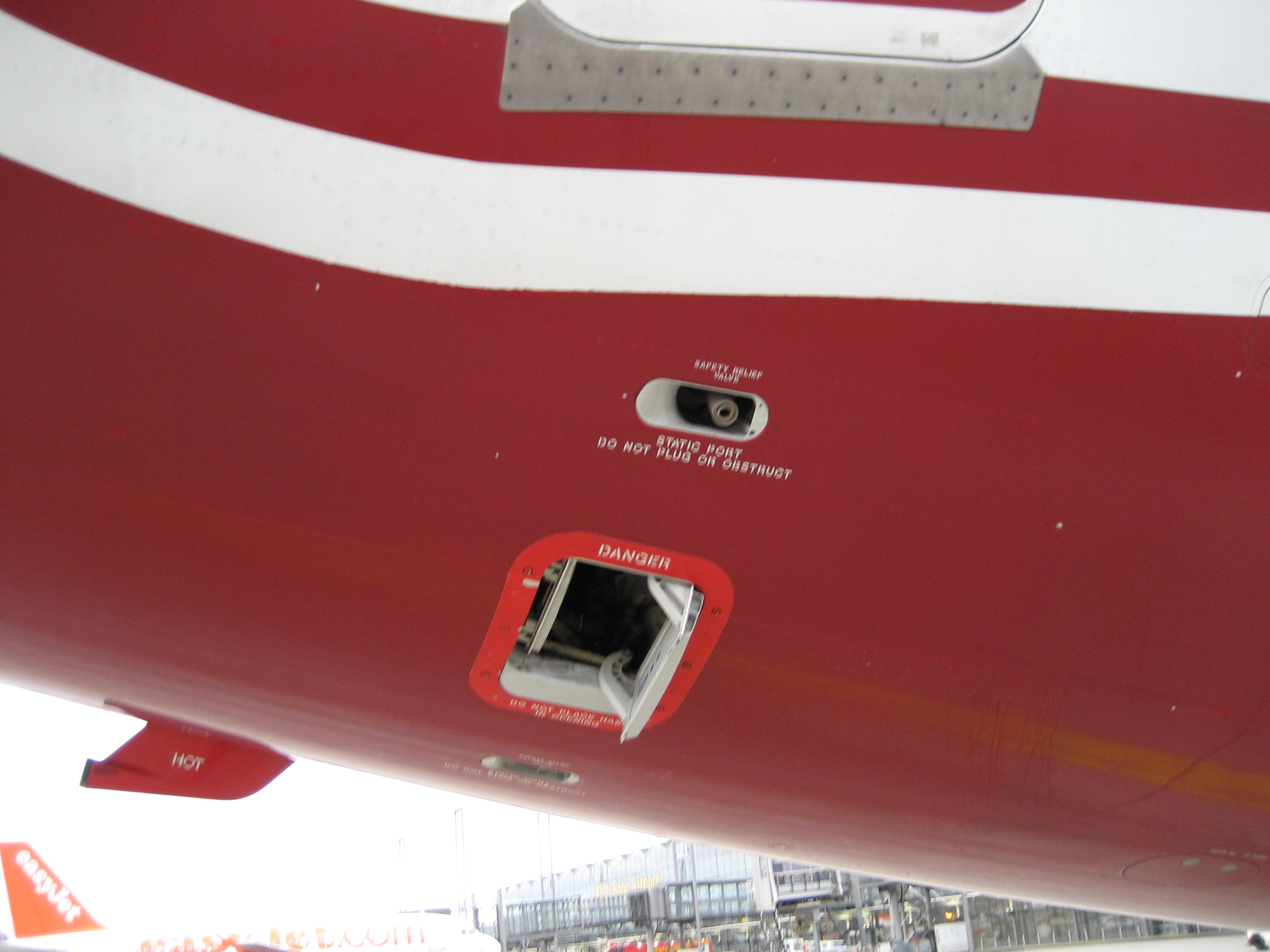
Outflow and pressure relief valve on a Boeing 737-800

Airflow into the fuselage is approximately constant, and pressure is maintained by varying the opening of the out-flow valve (OFV). Most modern jetliners have a single OFV located near the bottom aft end of the fuselage, although some larger aircraft like the Boeing 747 and 777 have two.

In the event the OFV should fail closed, at least two positive pressure relief valves (PPRV) and at least one negative pressure relief valve (NPRV) are provided to protect the fuselage from over- and under- pressurization.

Aircraft cabin pressure is commonly pressurized to a cabin altitude of 8000 feet or less. That means that the pressure is 10.9 pounds per square inch (75 kPa), which is the ambient pressure at 8,000 feet (2,400 m). Note that a lower cabin altitude is a higher pressure. The cabin pressure is controlled by a cabin pressure schedule, which associates each aircraft altitude with a cabin altitude. The new airliners such as the Airbus A350 and Boeing 787 will have lower maximum cabin altitudes which help in passenger fatigue reduction during flights.

The atmosphere at typical jetliner cruising altitudes is generally very dry and cold; the outside air pumped into the cabin on a long flight has the potential to cause condensation which might in turn cause corrosion or electrical faults, and is thus eliminated. Consequently, when humid air at lower altitudes is encountered and drawn in, the ECS dries it through the warming and cooling cycle and the water separator mentioned above, so that even with high external relative humidity, inside the cabin it will usually be not much higher than 10% relative humidity.

Although low cabin humidity has health benefits of preventing the growth of fungus and bacteria, the low humidity causes drying of the skin, eyes and mucosal membranes and contributes to dehydration, leading to fatigue, discomfort and health issues. In one study the majority of flight attendants reported discomfort and health issues from low humidity. In a statement to US Congress in 2003 a member of the Committee on Air Quality in Passenger Cabins of Commercial Aircraft said "low relative humidity might cause some temporary discomfort (e.g., drying eyes, nasal passages, and skin), but other possible short- or long-term effects have not been established".

A cabin humidity control system may be added to the ECS of some aircraft to keep relative humidity from extremely low levels, consistent with the need to prevent condensation. Furthermore, the Boeing 787 and Airbus A350, by using more corrosion-resistant composites in their construction, can operate with a cabin relative humidity of 16% on long flights.

== Health concerns ==
The bleed air comes from the engines but is bled from the engine upstream of the combustor. Air cannot flow backwards through the engine except during a compressor stall (essentially a jet engine backfire), thus the bleed air should be free of combustion contaminants from the normal running of the aircraft's own engines.

However, on occasions carbon seals can leak oil (containing potentially hazardous chemicals) into the bleed air, in what is known in the industry as a fume event. This is generally dealt with quickly since failed oil seals will reduce the engine life.

Oil contamination from this and other sources within the engine bay has led to health concerns from some advocacy groups and has triggered research by several academic institutions and regulatory agencies. However, no credible research has yielded evidence for the existence of a medical condition caused by fume events.
