= Unfiltered Breathed In =

2015 film by Tim van Beveren

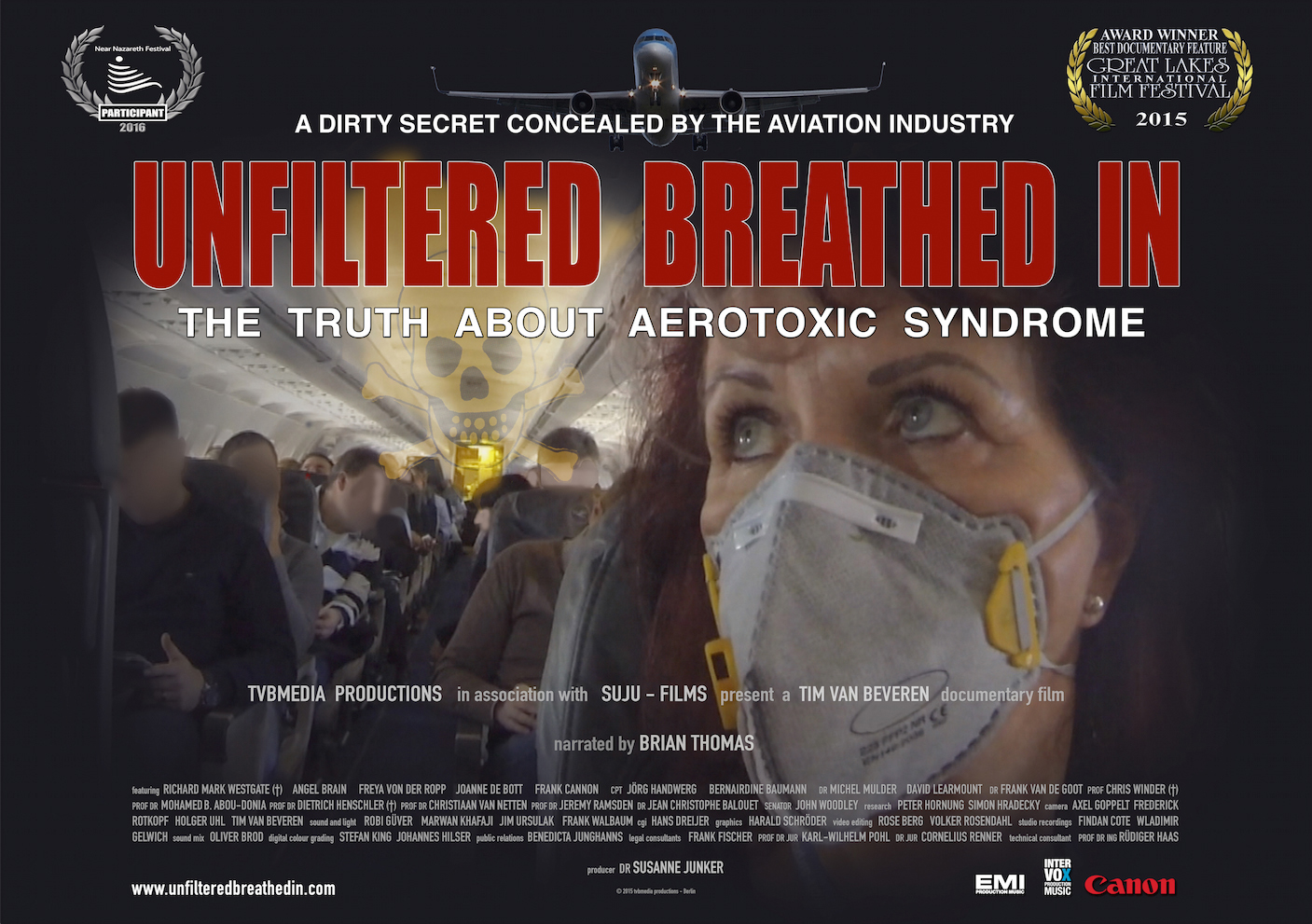
- Theatrical release poster
- Directed by: Tim van Beveren
- Release date: July 15, 2015
- Running time: 126 minutes
- Country: Germany
- Languages: English; German

Unfiltered Breathed In – The Truth About Aerotoxic Syndrome (German: Ungefiltert eingeatmet - Die Wahrheit über das Aerotoxische Syndrom) is an investigative documentary film by German journalist, author and filmmaker Tim van Beveren.

The film deals with the technical, medical, social, and political backgrounds of aerotoxic syndrome, which it portrays as a critical and controversial topic in aviation. It especially focuses on the analysis and scientific results of the forensic-pathological research conducted on the body of British pilot Richard M. Westgate, who before his death sought medical care for symptoms that he attributed to aerotoxic syndrome.

The world premiere took place on July 15, 2015, at the Babylon Cinema in Berlin. It was followed by a discussion with politicians, medical and legal experts as well as union representatives.

On October 12, 2015, the film was awarded "best documentary feature film" at the 2015 Great Lakes International Film Festival.
