= Aerotoxic Association =

Advocacy group

The Aerotoxic Association was founded on 18 June 2007, at the British Houses of Parliament by former BAe 146 Training Captain John Hoyte, to raise public awareness about the ill health allegedly caused after exposure to airliner cabin air that he claimed been contaminated to toxic levels, by engine oil leaking into the bleed air system, which pressurizes all jet aircraft, with the exception of the Boeing 787.

In addition to providing help and support to aircrew and passengers, the Aerotoxic Association promotes known technical solutions, such as toxic air detectors, and campaigns for changes in regulations to improve the quality of cabin air on airliners.

The phrase "aerotoxic syndrome" was coined by Chris Winder and Jean-Christophe Balouet in 2000 to describe the ill health allegedly caused by exposure to air which they claimed had been contaminated by jet engine oil. As of 2013 this syndrome is not recognized in medicine.

== Criticism ==
That report examined all exposures dating back to 1943 which showed that all documented exposures were to high concentrations, greatly in excess of the amount present in jet engine oil. He also noted that studies in Canada and the USA were unable to detect TCP in the cabin during flight. Prof Bagshaw notes that the symptoms are "largely the same as those reported by participants in all phase I drug trials", and are similar to the symptoms experienced by patients with chronic fatigue syndrome, gulf war syndrome, Lyme disease, chronic stress and chronic hyperventilation.

"A syndrome is a symptom complex, consistent and common to a given condition. Individuals who have 'aerotoxic syndrome' describe a wide range of inconsistent symptoms and signs with much individual variability. The evidence was independently reviewed by the Aerospace Medical Association, the US National Academy of Sciences and the Australian Civil Aviation Safety Authority Expert Panel. All concluded there is insufficient consistency to establish a medical syndrome and the 'aerotoxic syndrome' is not recognised in aviation medicine."
