= Aerotoxic syndrome =

Health effects associated with contaminated aeroplane cabin air

Aerotoxic syndrome relates to ill-health effects associated with breathing contaminated air in an airliner cabin. Researchers have associated aerotoxic syndrome with exposure to substances such as engine oil and hydraulic fluid. Although researchers have identified correlations between the aircraft occupational environment and symptoms of aerotoxic syndrome, this condition is not an established medical diagnosis because the incidence and aetiology of the condition are still under debate.

== Potential sources of contamination ==
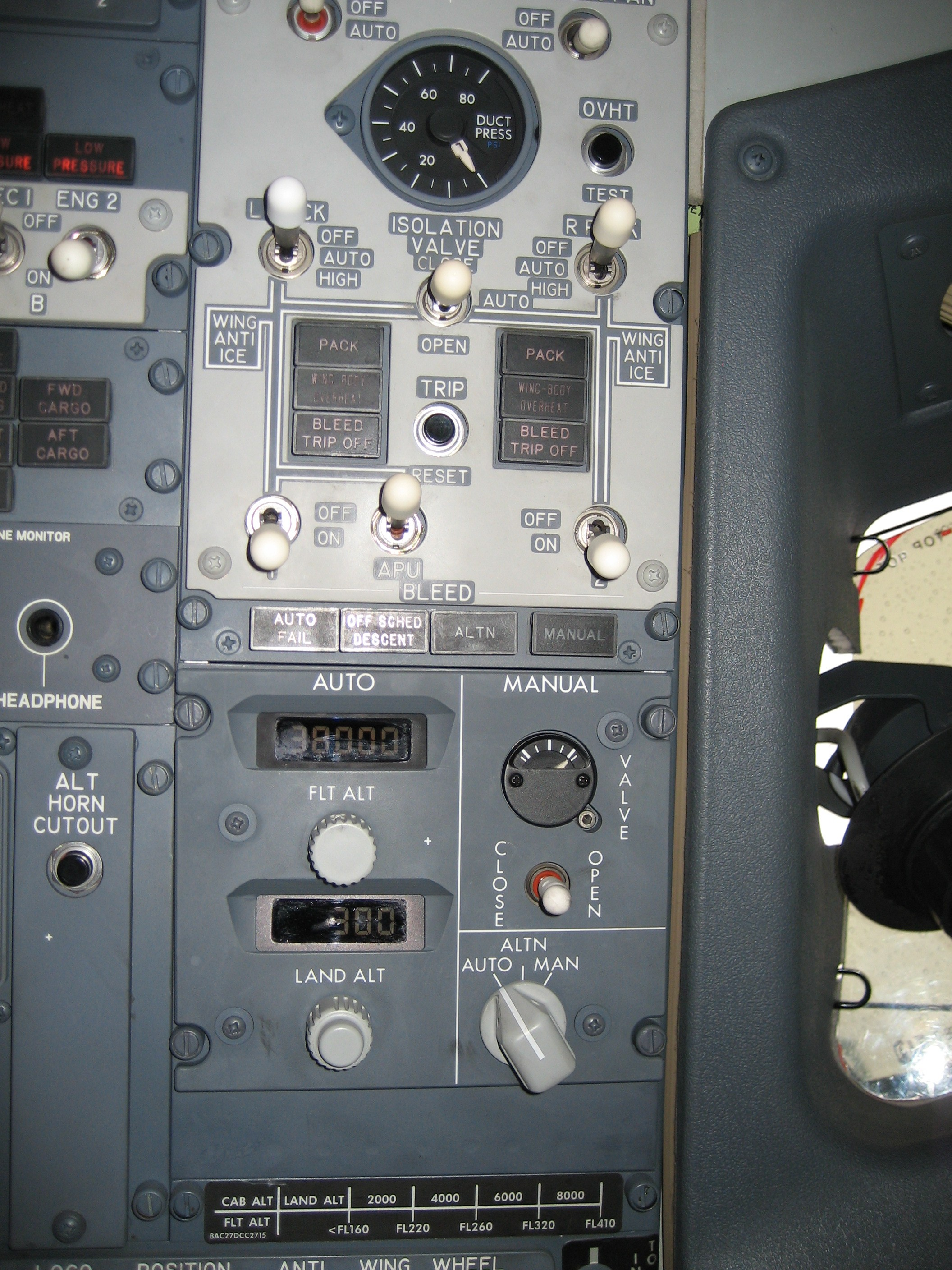
Cabin Pressure and Bleed Air Control Panels on a Boeing 737-800

Modern jetliners have environmental control systems (ECS) that manage the flow of cabin air. Outside air enters the engines and is compressed in the forward section of the engine, prior to the combustion section, ensuring no combustion products can enter the cabin. A portion of that compressed bleed air is used to pressurize the cabin. The ECS then recirculates some of that cabin air through HEPA filters, while the rest is directed to outflow valves, ensuring there is a constant supply of fresh, clean air coming into the cabin pressurization system at all times.

Jet engines require synthetic oils for lubrication. These oils contain ingredients such as tricresyl phosphate (TCP or TOCP), an organophosphate, which can be toxic to humans but only in quantities much larger than are found in aviation engine oil. Despite aviation engine oil's relative safety under normal conditions, the safety data sheet for Exxon Mobil Jet II, a commonly used lubricant oil in aviation, states that the oil can decompose "at elevated temperatures or under fire conditions," emitting harmful gasses, vapors, or fumes, such as carbon monoxide. Acute exposure to these decomposition products can result in symptoms such as headaches, nausea, and irritation of the eyes, nose, or throat.

Engine bearing seals are installed to ensure that critical engine bearings are continuously lubricated, and to prevent engine oil from leaking into the compressed air stream. Engine seals will leak a small amount of oil as a function of the seal design. This is known as the permissible oil leak rate. If a bearing seal fails and begins to leak, depending on the location of the seal, a higher amount of engine oil may be released into the compressed air stream. Oil leaks may be detected by an odour often called 'dirty socks', or, in more serious cases, by smoke in the cabin. This is known in the industry as a fume event.

== History ==
A year-long Australian Senate investigation in 2000 received evidence of some "successful applications for workers' compensation" for illness which the applicants attributed to exposure to fumes on a BAe 146. The applicants consisted of approximately 20 crew members who described oil fumes leaking into the aircraft cabin. That investigative committee concluded "the issue of fume contaminants should also be considered a safety issue with regard to the ability of cabin crew to properly supervise the evacuation of an aircraft and the ability of passengers to take part in an evacuation".

In 1996, Air UK reported overuse of a disinfectant (formaldehyde) for the toilets and to clean the galley floor and that inhalation of the fumes from that chemical, would produce light-headedness, headaches and nausea. "The CAA notified UK Operators at that time (CAA ref. 10A/380/15, dated 2 August 1996) of this potential hazard, as the misuse of this agent was apparently widespread."

The term "aerotoxic syndrome" was first published in 2000 by Chris Winder and Jean-Christophe Balouet, who created the term to describe the ill health symptoms which they argue were caused by exposure to air that, according to them, was contaminated by jet engine oil.

On 5 November 2000, both the captain and first officer of a Jersey European Airways BAe 146 became unwell while landing at Birmingham International Airport. Both became nauseous, and the captain experienced double vision and had difficulty judging height, but managed to land the aircraft safely. Both pilots were taken to a hospital but no cause for their illness was found. The incident investigation report concluded that "There is circumstantial evidence to suggest that the flight crew on G–JEAK were affected by contamination of the air supply, as a result of oil leakage from the auxiliary power unit (APU) cooling fan seal into the APU air stream, and into the ECS system ducting. This contamination allowed fumes to develop, a proportion of which entered the cabin and cockpit air supply."

An assessment by the UK's House of Lords Science and Technology Committee found that claims of health effects were unsubstantiated. An update in 2008 found no significant new evidence. The syndrome is not medically recognized.

In 2019, five British airlines including British Airways, Virgin Atlantic, Jet2, Thomas Cook Airlines and EasyJet were served lawsuits by union Unite over effect on aircrew.

On 31 July 2020, in the first case of its kind in the United States, the Oregon Workers' Compensation Board ruled in favour of Captain Andrew Myers, a Jet Blue Captain who was exposed chronically to contaminated air on the Airbus aircraft he flew followed by an acute oil fume event in early 2017. Myers suffered from a neuro-cognitive disorder and visual problems, all of which are potentially permanent. The carrier had initially denied Myers's claim, but the case confirmed that his chronic and "acute chemical inhalation" and "acute toxic inhalation" resulted in health problems such as toxic encephalopathy, mild neural cognitive disorder, and saccadic eye movement deficiency. After examination, a doctor ruled that chronic and toxic fume inhalation had rendered Myers "incapable of functioning" as an airline captain.

In September 2025, Delta Air Lines announced it would change engines to address the toxic fume problem.

== Research ==
In 1986, the United States Congress commissioned a report by the National Research Council (NRC) into cabin air quality. The report recommended a ban on smoking on aircraft in order to improve air quality. In 1988, the FAA banned smoking on domestic flights of less than two hours, and extended the ban in 1990 to all domestic flights and in 2000 to international flights.

The UK Parliament's Select Committee on Science and Technology concluded in its response to the many complaints received "from a number of witnesses, particularly the Organophosphate Information Network, BALPA, and the International Association of Flight Attendants, expressing concerns about the risk of tricresyl phosphate (TCP or TOCP) poisoning for cabin occupants, particularly for crew who might be subjected to repeated exposure in some aircraft types, as a result of oil leaking into the cabin air supply."

"This question – including the potential effects on aircrew from any long-term exposure – has been looked at in much greater detail by a Committee of the Australian Senate inquiring into particular allegations of such contamination in the BAe 146. Although its Report[58] referred extensively to cabin air quality and chemical contamination in the aircraft, and recommended that the engine lubricating oil used (a Mobil product) be subjected to a further hazardous chemical review, it made no specific points about TCP or TOCP that have given us additional concerns[59]. The absence of confirmed cases of TOCP poisoning from cabin air and the very low levels of TOCP that would be found in even the highly unlikely worst case of contamination from oil leaking into the air supply lead us to conclude that the concerns about significant risk to the health of airline passengers and crew are not substantiated."

According to a 2008 report by former British Airways head doctor Michael Bagshaw, Aviation Medicine Director at King's College London and an advisor to Airbus, there have been no peer-reviewed recorded cases of neurological harm in humans following TCP exposure. He pointed to an unpublished report from the Medical Toxicology Unit at Guy's Hospital in 2001 which looked at all exposures dating back to 1943 that showed that all documented exposures were to high concentrations greatly in excess of the amount present in jet oil.

In 2009 the UK House of Commons Library service to Members of Parliament summarized the research into a "relationship between the [engine oil chemical] leaks and these health symptoms" as inconclusive, citing "problems with identifying the exact chemical that might be entering the air supply and therefore identifying what impact it may have on health" and "reports of problems with fumes and/or health symptoms not being reported correctly". In the same year, a relatively innovative clean air system using electronic compression rather than bleed air was implemented on the Boeing 787 Dreamliner, the only plane to use it so far.

In his 2013 paper, "Cabin Air Quality: A review of current aviation medical understanding," Bagshaw noted further: "A German study in 2013 of 332 crew members who had reported fume/odour during their last flight failed to detect metabolites of TCP in urine samples. The authors concluded that health complaints could not be linked to TCP exposure in cabin air. ... A syndrome is a symptom complex, consistent and common to a given condition. Individuals with 'aerotoxic syndrome' describe a wide range of inconsistent symptoms and signs with much individual variability."

The evidence was independently reviewed by the Aerospace Medical Association, the US National Academy of Sciences and the Australian Civil Aviation Safety Authority (CASA) Expert Panel. All concluded there is insufficient consistency to establish a medical syndrome, and the 'aerotoxic syndrome' is not recognised in aviation medicine."

The 'nocebo effect' was among the conclusions published in a 2013 COT (Committee on Toxicity) position paper: "The acute illness which has occurred in relation to perceived episodes of contamination might reflect a toxic effect of one or more chemicals, but it could also have occurred through nocebo effects. There is strong scientific evidence that nocebo effects can lead to (sometimes severely disabling) illness from environmental exposures that are perceived as hazardous." However, there is no reliable, systematic method for establishing whether nocebo effects are responsible for individual cases of illness. The nocebo effect may also be inadequate at explaining the prevalence and consistency of symptoms experienced by people exposed to engine oil fumes on aircraft.

A 2017 study published by World Health Organization journal Public Health Panorama found a clear link between exposure to contaminated air on aircraft and a range of health issues. The study involved 200 aircrew members, and identified a pattern of acute and chronic symptoms among affected aircrew, including headaches, dizziness, breathing problems, and vision problems. These symptoms can have a significant impact on the health and well-being of aircrew, potentially affecting their ability to perform their duties safely and effectively.

== Media coverage ==
In a 2006 article in Aviation Today, Simon Bennett found that media coverage of contaminated cabin air has been sensationalized, with distortions of facts. He cited headlines such as "You are being gassed when you travel by air," and "Death in the Air" and a sub-title of "Every day, planes flying in and out of London City Airport are slowly killing us." Bennett noted that the article with the latter subtitle stated in its body that the Department of the Environment, Transport and the Regions (DETR) found that oil seal failures occur once in every 22,000 flights. A 2015 FAA-funded study found fume events occur on 1 in 5,000 flights, a figure confirmed by Boeing.

The Sunday Sun, in an article entitled "Flight Fumes Warning", cited the industry pressure group AOPIS in saying that passengers jetting off to their holidays were unknowingly exposed to deadly chemicals, and that brain damage could result if they breathed the toxic fumes. The Sun also cited the UK Civil Aviation Authority finding that leakage into aircraft cabins is a very rare event occurring only if there is a fault with an aircraft.

When the results of a clinical audit of the "cognitive functioning of aircrew exposed to contaminated air" were submitted by Sarah Mackenzie Ross to the UK government's Committee on Toxicity of Chemicals in Food, Consumer Products and the Environment (COT), some media used it to write articles that were sensational and misleading. Dagbladet.no wrote that the Ross report "... adds weight to the hypothesis that compounds resembling nerve gas in cabin and flight deck air have caused irreparable neurological damage to aircrew", though the report itself stated that:

"[T]he evidence available to us in this audit does not enable us to draw firm conclusions regarding a causal link with exposure to contaminated air." Additionally,

The report was a "clinical audit of aircrew seen for clinical purposes," and thus there were limitations to the study.

The "'aircrew seen for clinical purposes' were in fact a self-selecting sample of pilots." Meaning that they all came from a group that already believed they had been damaged by contaminated air.

That self-selected sample group "was not compared to a control group." Ross herself said "The conclusions that can be drawn from these findings have limitations."

She further stated: "The author ... makes no attempt to ascribe causality."

The report's conclusions were ambiguous: "There was no evidence of ... global intellectual decline, language or perceptual deficits .... Indeed pilots were intact on the vast majority of tests. However, there was evidence of under-functioning on tests associated with psychomotor speed, executive functioning and attention ...."

And finally, "[T]he evidence available to us in this audit does not enable us to draw firm conclusions regarding a causal link with exposure to contaminated air."

In 2012, the death of British Airways pilot Richard Westgate made headlines because before his death, he sought medical care for symptoms that he attributed to aerotoxic syndrome, and there was some disagreement among professionals about whether contaminated air could be ruled out as a cause of death. Ultimately, his death was legally ruled as an accidental sedative overdose, but his mother maintained that British Airways and other airliners neglected to adequately protect passengers and crew from airborne toxins, and that the resulting hazardous working conditions contributed to Westgate's death. This event was publicized further in 2015 with the release of Unfiltered Breathed In, a documentary about aerotoxic syndrome with a special focus on Westgate's death.

Former British Airways Captain Tristan Loraine BCAi also produced a number of documentaries on the subject matter through Fact Not Fiction Films. Titles include Welcome Aboard Toxic Airlines (2007), Broken Wings (2011), Angel Without Wings (2010), A Dark Reflection (2015) and Everybody Flies (2019).

Journalist Kiera Feldman published an extensive article on the subject in the Los Angeles Times on 17 December 2020.

== See also ==
- Air quality index
- Altitude sickness
- Carbon monoxide poisoning
- Exhaust gas recirculation
- Household air pollution
- Indoor air quality
- Japan Air Lines food poisoning incident
- Minimum efficiency reporting value
- NASA Clean Air Study
- Organophosphate-induced delayed neuropathy
- Oxygen sensor
- Sick building syndrome
- Somatic symptom disorder
