= Toxic encephalopathy =

- Specialty: Neurology
- Causes: Acute or chronic exposure to neurotoxins

Toxic encephalopathy is a neurologic disorder caused by exposure to neurotoxic organic solvents such as toluene, following exposure to heavy metals such as manganese, as a side effect of melarsoprol treatment for African trypanosomiasis, adverse effects to prescription drugs, or exposure to extreme concentrations of any natural toxin such as cyanotoxins found in shellfish or freshwater cyanobacteria crusts. Toxic encephalopathy can occur following acute or chronic exposure to neurotoxicants, which includes all natural toxins. Exposure to toxic substances can lead to a variety of symptoms, characterized by an altered mental status, memory loss, and visual problems. Toxic encephalopathy can be caused by various chemicals, some of which are commonly used in everyday life, or cyanotoxins which are bio-accumulated from harmful algal blooms (HABs) which have settled on the benthic layer of a waterbody. Toxic encephalopathy can permanently damage the brain and currently treatment is mainly just for the symptoms.

== Signs and symptoms ==
"Encephalopathy" is a general term describing brain malfunctions and "toxic" asserts that the malfunction is caused by toxins on the brain. The most prominent characteristic of toxic encephalopathy is an altered mental status. Acute intoxication is a reversible symptom of exposure to many synthetic chemical neurotoxicants. Acute intoxication symptoms include lightheadedness, dizziness, headache and nausea, and regular cumulative exposure to these neurotoxicants over a number of years puts the individual at high risk for developing toxic encephalopathy. Chronic exposure to low levels of neurotoxic chemicals can also cause reversible changes in mood and affect which resolve with cessation of exposure. Acute and chronic toxic encephalopathy on the other hand, are persistent changes in neurological function that typically occur with exposure to higher concentrations and longer durations respectively. The symptoms of acute and chronic toxic encephalopathy do not resolve with cessation of exposure and can include memory loss, dementia, small personality changes/increased irritability, insidious onset of concentration difficulties, headache, lightheadedness, ataxia, involuntary movements (parkinsonism), fatigue, seizures, arm strength problems, and depression. A paper by Feldman and colleagues described neurobehavioral effects in a 57-year-old house painter with regular exposure to large amounts of solvents.

Magnetic Resonance Imaging (MRI) analyses have also demonstrated increased rates of dopamine synthesis in the putamen, reduced anterior and total corpus callosum volume, demyelination in the parietal white matter, basal ganglia, and thalamus, as well as atypical activation of frontal areas of the brain due to neural compensation.

The regions of interest on SPECT brain imaging include a majority of all cortical regions, and the globus pallidus in carbon monoxide poisoning. Based on medical literature on SPECT brain imaging, signature patterns for toxic encephalopathy is a nonspecific patchy, diffuse pattern on the cortex, and sometimes is shown in subcortical regions, if exposure was severe.

== Causes ==
In addition, chemicals, such as lead, that could instigate toxic encephalopathy are sometimes found in everyday products such as prescription drugs, cleaning products, building materials, pesticides, air fresheners, and even perfumes. These harmful chemicals can be inhaled (in the case of air fresheners) or applied (in the case of perfumes). The substances diffuse into the brain rapidly, as they are lipophilic and readily transported across the blood–brain barrier. This is a result of increased membrane solubility and local blood flow, with central nervous system (CNS) solvent uptake being further increased with high levels of physical activity. When they are not detoxified immediately, the symptoms of toxic encephalopathy begin to emerge. However, in chronic situations, these effects may not become severe enough to be noticed until much later. Increased exposure time and increased concentration of the chemicals will worsen the effects of toxic encephalopathy, due to the associated structural CNS damage and direct functional impairment consequences.

Fume events on aircraft have been linked to cases of toxic encephalopathy, for example in the case of JetBlue Captain Andrew Myers, who as a result of exposure needed a cane to walk, experienced tremors and struggled to speak. In the following year, the Federal Aviation Administration revoked Myers' medical certificate; the workers compensation board agreed that Myers experienced brain damage as a result of the event.

== Diagnosis ==
Rapid diagnosis is important to attempt to prevent further damage to the brain and further neurologic deficits. It is a diagnosis of exclusion, so a full work up for other possible etiologies (hepatic, uremic, infectious, oncologic) should be performed. In addition to the neurological examination, diagnostic testing could include MRI, PET or SPECT brain imaging, EEG, QEEG and most importantly, neuropsychological testing. Screening for heavy metals, as well as other toxins, should be done immediately as those are some of the most common causes and the patient can then remove themselves from the dangerous environment. In addition, a full examination of blood (CBC) and metabolites (CMP) should be done.

== Treatment ==
A physician will prescribe care and treatment based on the specifics of the diagnosis. For example, anticonvulsants are used to treat seizures related to encephalopathy. Other potential treatments include diet changes, nutritional supplements, dialysis, and organ replacement.

Lifelong abstinence from alcohol, a well-established neurotoxin and cause of the condition, is encouraged to prevent further loss of neurocognitive function.

Management of affected individuals consists of immediate removal from exposure to the toxic substance(s), treatment of the common clinical manifestation of depression if present, and counselling for the provision of life strategies to help cope with the potentially debilitating condition.

== Prognosis ==
Toxic encephalopathy is often irreversible. If the source of the problem is treated by removing the toxic chemical from the system, further damage can be prevented, but prolonged exposure to toxic chemicals can quickly destroy the brain. Long-term studies have demonstrated residual cognitive impairment (primarily attention and information-processing impairment resulting in dysfunction in working memory) up to 10 years following cessation of exposure. Severe cases of toxic encephalopathy can be life-threatening.

== Research ==
Research is being done by organizations such as NINDS (National Institute of Neurological Disorders and Stroke) on what substances can cause encephalopathy, how they do this, and eventually how to protect, treat, and cure the brain from this condition.

== See also ==
- Brain damage
- Chronic solvent-induced encephalopathy
- Encephalopathy
- Lead poisoning
- Neurology
