= Bleed air =

Aircraft gas turbine function

Bleed air in aerospace engineering is compressed air taken from the compressor stage of a gas turbine engine, upstream of its fuel-burning sections. Automatic air supply and cabin pressure controller (ASCPC) valves bleed air from low- or high-pressure engine compressor sections; as the pressure varies with engine operation, low-stage air is used during high-power operation, and high-stage air is used during descent and other low-power operations. Bleed air from that system can be utilized for internal cooling of the engine, cross-starting another engine, engine and airframe anti-icing, cabin pressurization, pneumatic actuators, air-driven motors, pressurizing the hydraulic reservoir, and waste and water storage tanks. Some engine maintenance manuals refer to such systems as "customer bleed air".

Bleed air is valuable in an aircraft for two properties: high temperature and high pressure (typical values are 200–250 °C (400–500 °F) and 275 kPa (40 psi), for regulated bleed air exiting the engine pylon for use throughout the aircraft).

== Uses ==
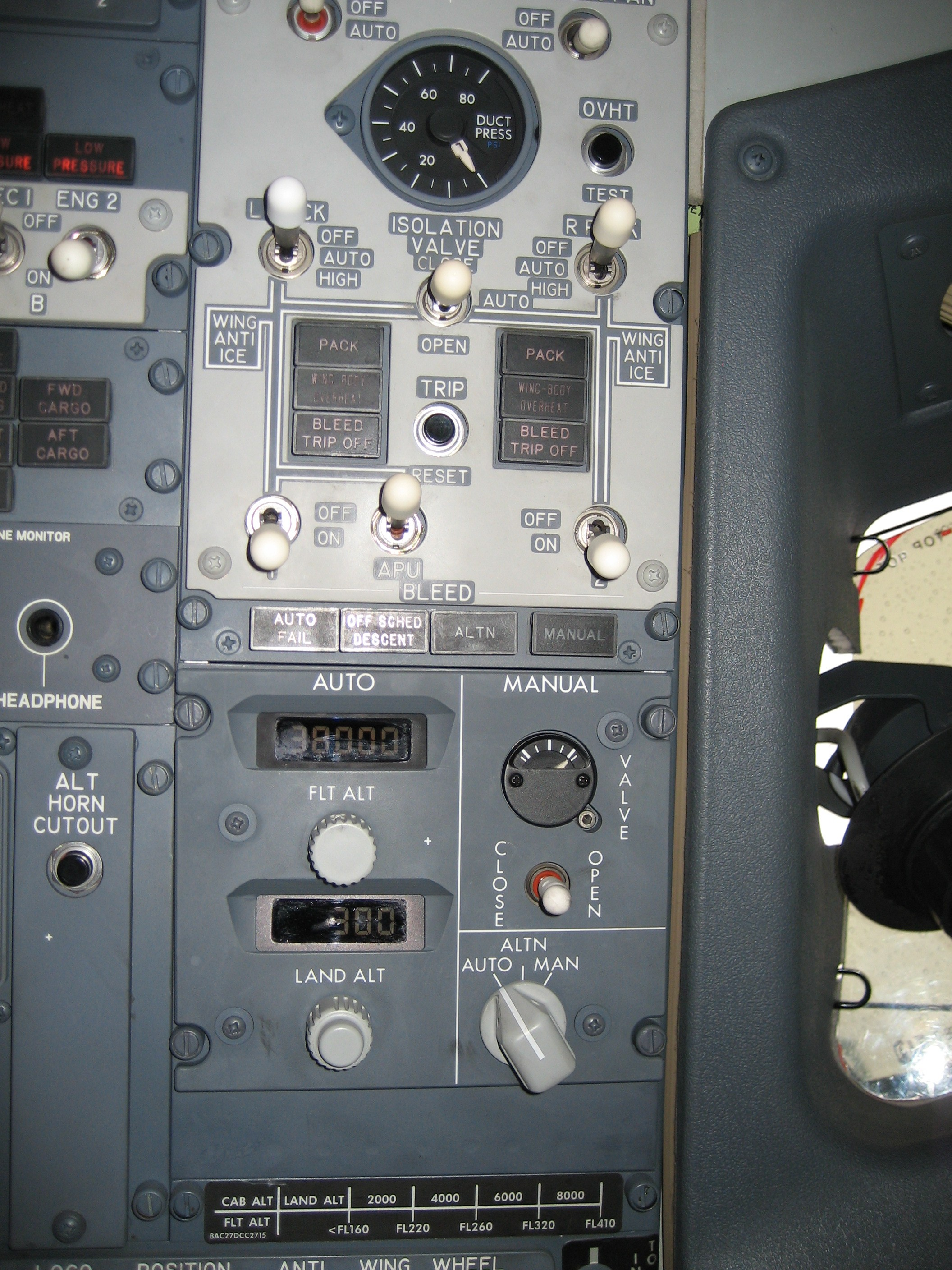
Cabin pressure and bleed air controls in a Boeing 737-800

Environmental control system (ECS) schematic of Boeing 737-300

In civil aircraft, bleed air's primary use is to provide pressure for the aircraft cabin by supplying air to the environmental control system. Additionally, bleed air is used to prevent the formation of ice on parts of the aircraft on which it would endanger the aircraft (such as wing leading edges).

Bleed air is used to power aircraft systems because it is readily available from the engines. For example, bleed air from one engine can be used to start the other engines. Lavatory water storage tanks are pressurized by bleed air that is fed through a pressure regulator.

When used for cabin pressurization, bleed air from the engine must first be cooled because it leaves the compressor at temperatures up to 250 °C (500 °F). It is passed through an air-to-air heat exchanger cooled by the cold outside air. It is then fed to an air cycle machine that regulates the temperature and flow of air into the cabin, keeping the environment comfortable. New bleed air is continuously flowing into the cabin and stale air leaving. Part of it is reused after passing through filters. This process is contrary to the common misconception that cabin air in airplanes is the same air being recycled.

Bleed air is also used to heat the engine intakes. This prevents ice from forming, accumulating, breaking loose, and being ingested by the engine, which could damage it.

On aircraft powered by jet engines, a similar system is used for wing anti-icing by the 'hot-wing' method. In icing conditions, water droplets condensing on a wing's leading edge can freeze. If that happens, the ice build-up adds weight and changes the shape of the wing, causing a degradation in performance and possibly a critical loss of control or lift. To prevent this, hot bleed air is pumped through the inside of the wing's leading edge, heating it to a temperature above freezing, which prevents the formation of ice. The air then exits through small holes in the wing edge.

On propeller-driven aircraft, it is common to use bleed air to inflate a rubber boot on the leading edge, breaking the ice loose after it has already formed.

Bleed air from the high-pressure compressor of the engine is used to supply reaction control valves as used for part of the flight control system in the Harrier family of military aircraft.

== Contamination ==
On about 1 in 5,000 flights, bleed air used for air conditioning and pressurization can be contaminated by chemicals such as oil or hydraulic fluid. This is known as a fume event. While those chemicals can be irritating, such events have not been established to cause long-term harm.

Certain neurological and respiratory ill health effects have been linked anecdotally to exposure to bleed air that has been alleged to have been contaminated with toxic levels on commercial and military aircraft. This alleged long-term illness is referred to as aerotoxic syndrome, but it is not a medically recognized syndrome. One potential contaminant is tricresyl phosphate.

Many lobbying groups have been set up to advocate for research into this hazard, including the Aviation Organophosphate Information Site (AOPIS) (2001), the Global Cabin Air Quality Executive (2006) and the UK-based Aerotoxic Association (2007). Cabin Environment Research is one of many functions of the ACER Group, but their researchers have not yet established any causal relationship.

Although a study made for the EU in 2014 confirmed that contamination of cabin air could be a problem, that study also stated:

A lot of reported fume events caused comfort limitations for the occupants but posed no danger. A verification of cabin air contamination with toxic substances (e.g. TCP/TOCP) was not possible with the fume events the BFU investigated.

While no scientific evidence to date has found that airliner cabin air has been contaminated to toxic levels (exceeding known safe levels, in ppm, of any dangerous chemical), a court in Australia in March 2010 found in favor of a former airline flight attendant who claimed she suffered chronic respiratory problems after being exposed to oil fumes on a trip in March 1992. Such testing is infrequent due to Boeing's refusal to install air quality sensors in its planes, fearing lawsuits from crew or passengers over fume events, and airlines refused to allow flight attendants to carry air samplers after Congress mandated chemical measurements.

The FAA has revoked the medical certificates of several pilots who developed neurological issues after fume events. A judge who awarded workers' compensation to a pilot who had suffered toxic encephalopathy (brain damage) from a fume event condemned the airline industry's obstructionism around fume events.

In July 2015, pilots on a Spirit Airlines flight were partially incapacitated by fumes in bleed air.

== Bleedless aircraft ==
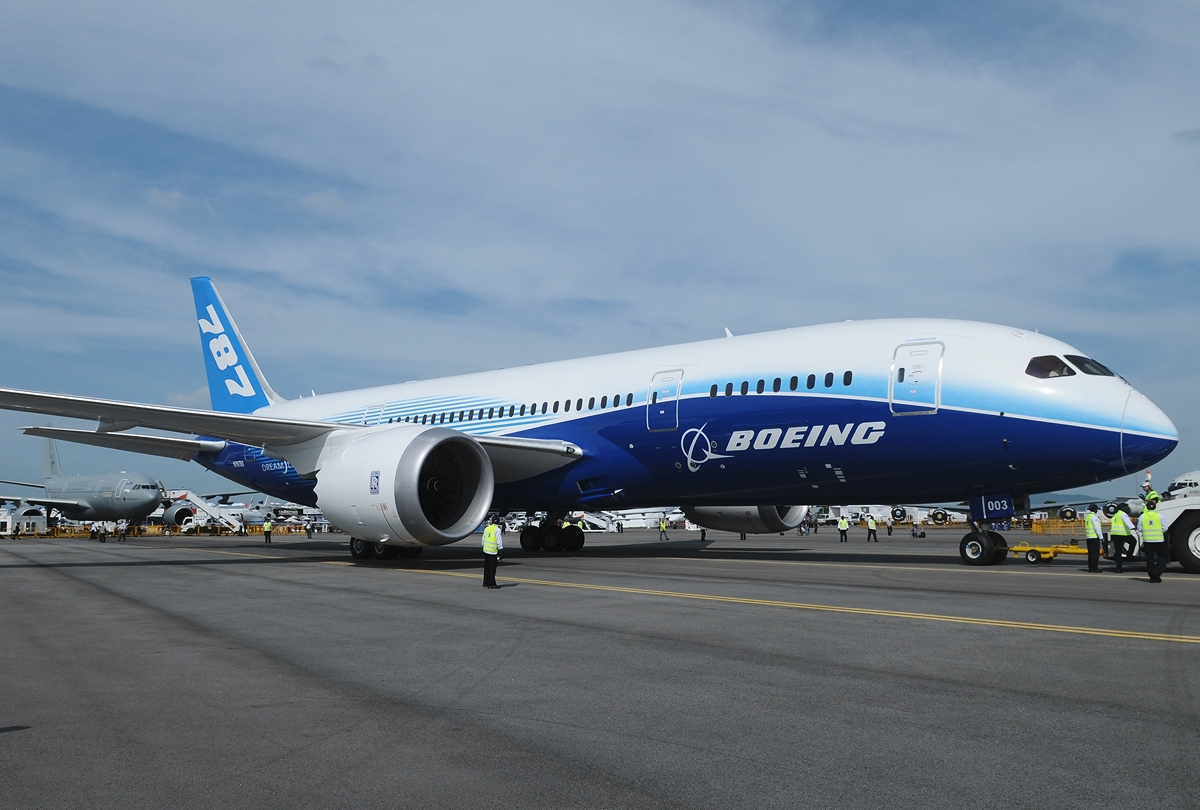
Boeing 787 Dreamliner is a primary example of modern "bleedless" airliners.

Bleed air systems have been in use for several decades in passenger jets. Recent improvements in solid-state electronics have enabled pneumatic power systems to be replaced by electric power systems. In a bleedless aircraft such as the Boeing 787, each engine has two variable-frequency electrical generators to compensate for not providing compressed air to external systems. Eliminating bleed air and replacing it with extra electric generation is believed to provide a net improvement in engine efficiency, lower weight, and ease of maintenance.

According to Boeing internal documents, eliminating the use of bleed air as a source of cabin air also translates into the "elimination of engine contaminants potentially entering cabin air supply".

=== Benefits ===
A bleedless aircraft wastes less fuel by eliminating the need to take compressed air from too-high a pressure in the engine and then wastefully reducing its pressure to suit a particular requirement. A further fuel saving comes from reduced aircraft weight as no bleed ducts, valves and heat exchangers are required.

The APU (auxiliary power unit) does not need to supply bleed air when the main engines are not operating. Aerodynamics are improved due to the lack of bleed air vent holes on the wings. By driving cabin air supply compressors at the minimum required speed, no energy wasting modulating valves are required. High-temperature, high-pressure air cycle machine (ACM) packs can be replaced with low temperature, low-pressure packs to increase efficiency. At cruise altitude, where most aircraft spend the majority of their time and burn the majority of their fuel, the ACM packs can be bypassed entirely, saving even more energy. Since no bleed air is taken from the engines for the cabin, the potential of engine oil contamination of the cabin air supply is eliminated.

Lastly, advocates of the design say it improves safety as heated air is confined to the engine pod, as opposed to being pumped through pipes and heat exchangers in the wing and near the cabin, where a leak could damage surrounding systems.

== See also ==
- Components of jet engines
