= Dedi Priadi =

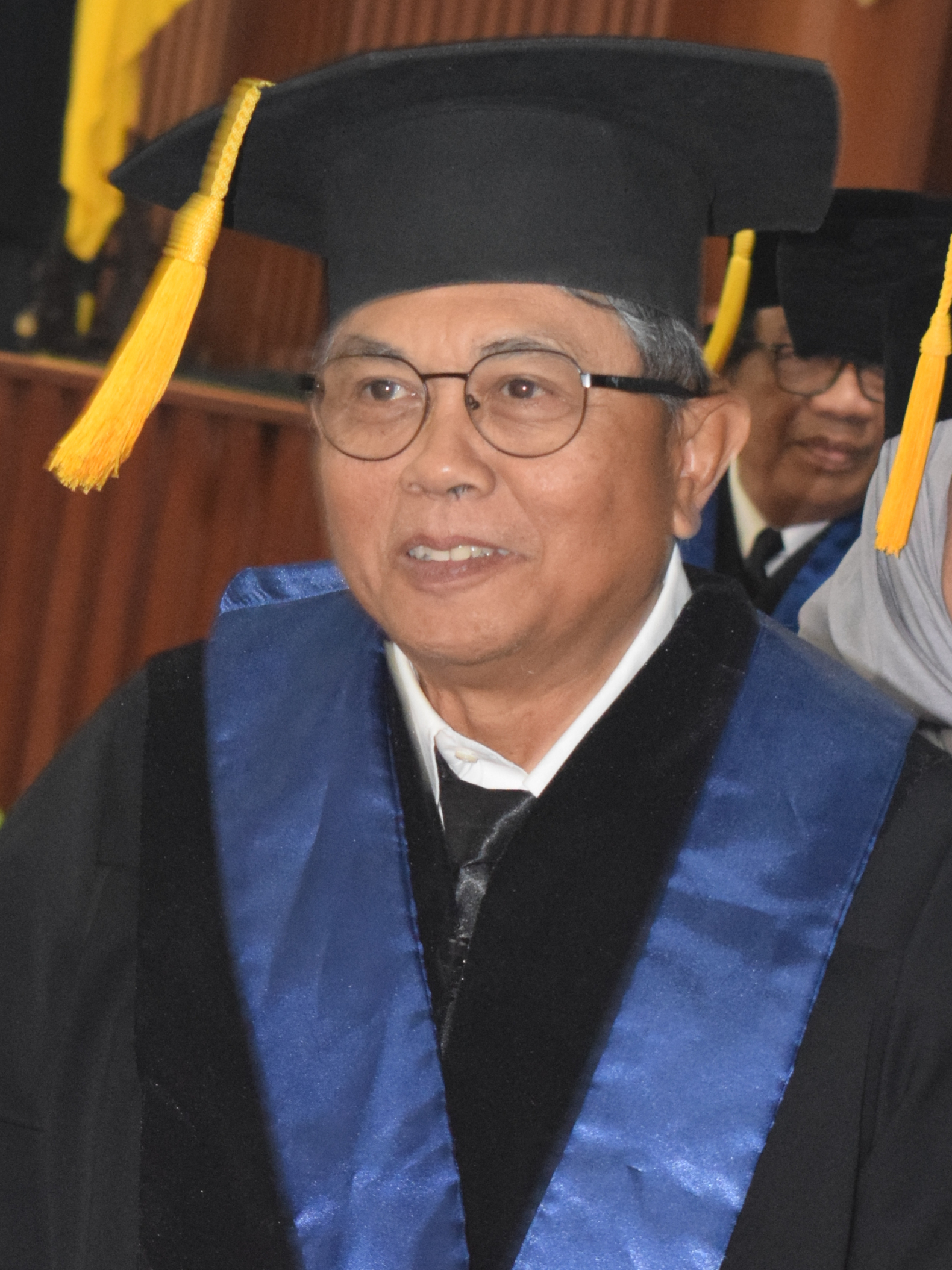

Deputy Rector for Academic and Student Affairs of the University of Indonesia
- Acting
- In office 15 March 2024 – 16 December 2024
- Preceded by: Abdul Haris
- Succeeded by: Mahmud Sudibandriyo

Deputy Rector for Human Resources and Assets of the University of Indonesia
- In office 21 October 2020 – 16 December 2024
- Preceded by: Muhammad Luthfi Zuhdi
- Succeeded by: Agus Setiawan (Infrastructure and Facility)
- In office 10 August 2018 – 16 December 2019
- Preceded by: Hamid Chalid
- Succeeded by: Muhammad Luthfi Zuhdi

Dean of the Faculty of Engineering of the University of Indonesia
- In office 8 January 2014 – 8 January 2018
- Preceded by: Bambang Sugiarto
- Succeeded by: Hendri D. S. Budiono

Personal details
- Born: October 17, 1959 (age 66) Jakarta, Indonesia
- Education: University of Indonesia (Ir., Prof.); École nationale supérieure des mines de Paris (DEA, Dr.)

Dedi Priadi (born 17 October 1959) is an Indonesian lecturer, scientist, and university administrator. He is the Deputy Rector for Human Resources and Assets of the University of Indonesia (UI) from 2020 to 2024 and the acting Deputy Rector for Academic and Student Affairs of the University of Indonesia from March until December 2024. He was previously the dean of the faculty of engineering from 2014 to 2018.

== Early life and education ==
Dedi was born on 17 October 1959 in Jakarta. Upon completing high school at the 8th Jakarta Senior High School in 1979, Dedi studied metallurgy at UI. He graduated in 1986 and continued his postgraduate studies at the École nationale supérieure des mines de Paris. He received his master's degree in 1990 and his doctorate in 1993.

== Academic career ==
After completing his studies in France, Dedi returned to Indonesia and began lecturing in his almamater. In the faculty, he taught material forming, composite materials, structure, and rheology. Dedi was the chair of the metallurgy department from 2003 to 2008. In 2008, Dedi was nominated for the dean of the faculty of engineering but lost the selection process to Bambang Sugiarto. Dedi was then appointed by Bambang as first deputy dean.

On 13 February 2013, Dedi was appointed as a full professor in mechanic metallurgical engineering. In his inaugural speech, titled The Role of Metal Forming Technology and Utilization of Steel Materials in the Indonesian Metal Manufacturing Industry, Dedi discussed the role of metal forming technology and the use of steel materials in Indonesia's metal manufacturing industry.

On 29 November 2013, Dedi was selected as the dean of the engineering faculty. In his presentation, Dedi aimed at enhancing the faculty by developing research groups, promoting technopreneurship, integrating IT-based learning, and fostering strategic partnerships with industries and foreign universities. He was installed for the role on 8 January 2014 and served until his replacement by Hendri D. S. Budiono on 8 January 2018. Two days following his replacement, Dedi was appointed as director of UI's technology institute. He held this position for less than a year, as in 9 November he was replaced by Achmad Hery Fuad.

On 10 August 2018, Dedi was installed as the Deputy Rector for Human Resources and Assets of UI by rector Muhammad Anis. After Anis was replaced by rector Ari Kuncoro the next year, Ari appointed Dedi to head the newly established Cooperation, Ventura and Digital Agency on 16 December 2019. Dedi was restored to his previous post as the Deputy Rector for Human Resources and Assets on 21 October 2020. Following the appointment of Deputy Rector for Academic and Student Affairs Abdul Haris as the Director General for Higher Education, Research, and Technology, Dedi was also appointed to hold the position in an acting capacity.
