= Khairul Munadi =

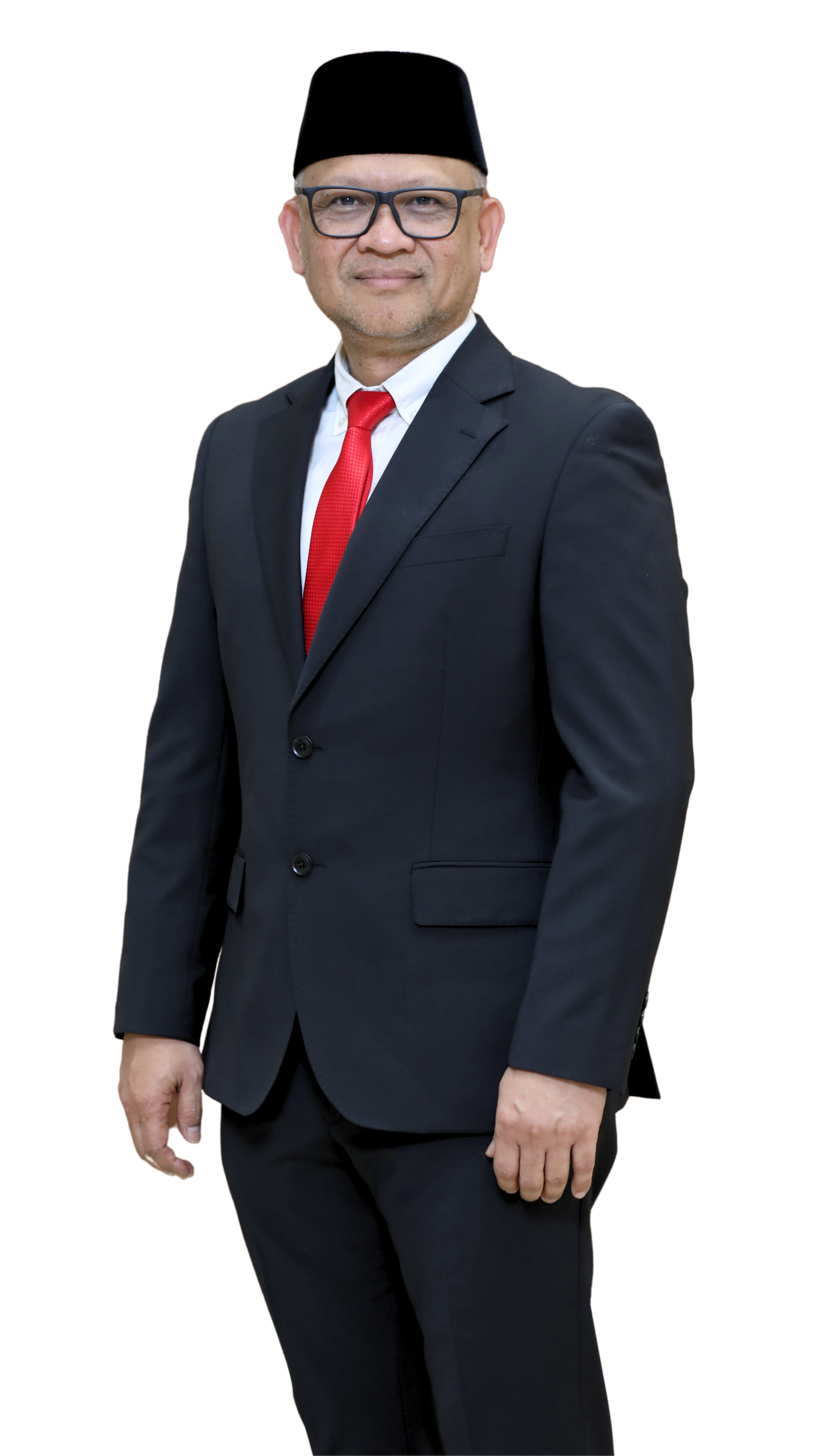

Director General of Higher Education
- Incumbent
- Assumed office 12 December 2024 (Note: Acting until 6 January 2025)
- Minister: Satryo Brodjonegoro; Brian Yuliarto
- Preceded by: Abdul Haris

Personal details
- Born: August 27, 1971 (age 54) Seulimeum, Aceh Besar, Aceh, Indonesia
- Education: Sepuluh Nopember Institute of Technology (S.T.); Tokyo Metropolitan University (M.Eng., Ph.D.)

Khairul Munadi (born 27 August 1971) is an Indonesian professor of engineering who is the Director General of Higher Education in the Ministry of Higher Education, Science, and Technology since 12 December 2024. He is also a lecturer at the electrical engineering department of the Syiah Kuala University in Aceh and had previously served as the director for institutional affairs in the directorate general of higher education from October 2024.

== Early life and education ==
Khairul was born in Aceh on 27 August 1971 as the son of Anwar Hamzah and Mariani, who both worked as civil servants. He completed his primary education at the 3rd Banda Aceh State High School and continued his education at the Sepuluh Nopember Institute of Technology, majoring in electrical engineering.

Khairul received a scholarship to study digital image processing at the Tokyo Metropolitan University. He obtained his master's degree and doctoral from the university in 2004 and 2007, respectively. He completed his postdoctoral studies at the university in 2008 before returning to Indonesia.

== Academic career ==
Upon graduating from university, Khairul began working at the Grasberg mine in Papua. He then worked as a system engineer at Alcatel Telspace in Jakarta an as a regional manager of Alcatel Enkomindo in Medan. In 1998, he began his academia career as an adjunct lecturer at the Syiah Kuala University, where he would fly to Aceh every Saturday to teach electrical engineering. He resigned and decided to pursue a full-time career as a lecturer in 1999, despite receiving only one-twelfth of his prior wage as a regional manager.

Aside lecturing at the electrical engineering department, Khairul also lectured at the disaster studies and electrical engineering postgraduate major. He also received grants for research in Netherlands, Japan, and Turkey. The government selected him as a promoter for the Master to Doctoral Education Scholarship Programme for Excellent Scholars (PMDSU) programme as well as an assessor for the National Accreditation Board for Higher Education.

Khairul was entrusted to head the electrical engineering major and later the Tsunami and Disaster Mitigation Research Center (TDMRC). Under his leadership, the TDMRC was involved in South-South knowledge exchange and was designated as a Science Center of Excellence by the Minister of Research of Technology. Outside the university, Khairul was the Industry Relation Coordinator at The Institute of Electrical and Electronics Engineers (IEEE) Indonesia Section, deputy chairman of Union of Indonesian Disaster Experts, and a board member of the Association of Indonesian Professors. He left his post as the head of TDMRC on 11 October 2021.

=== Full professorship ===
In August 2019, Khairul was appointed as a full professor in electrical engineering at the Syiah Kuala University. He was inaugurated as a full professor on 26 February 2020 alongside his wife, who also became a full professor on the same occasion. His inaugural speech, titled Development of Smart Devices for Early Detection of Diseases Based on Thermal Imaging and Deep Learning, highlighted his research on thermal imaging, which involves observing objects through thermal sensors or cameras without physical contact.

== Government career ==
On 4 July 2019, Khairul was installed as a member of the technical commission for environment and disaster in the National Research Council (NRC). He was named as the education and cultural attaché at the Indonesian embassy in Dili from November 2020 to early 2021, and for the same position at the Indonesian embassy in London from 2021 to 2024.

On 10 October 2024, Khairul was installed as the director for institutional affairs in the directorate general of higher education. He was appointed to the position after scoring the highest in a selection process held by the Ministry of Education, Culture, Research, and Technology in September 2024. Two months later, he became the acting director general of higher education after the appointment of the previous officeholder, Abdul Haris, to the Coordinating Ministry for Social Empowerment. He assumed the office in a permanent capacity on 6 January 2025.

== Personal life ==
Khairul is married to Fitria Arnia, who is also a full professor in electrical engineering. The couple met while attending an international science conference. At that time, Khairul was a student representing the Sepuluh Nopember Institute of Technology, while Fitria was representing the University of North Sumatra. The couple was the first couple to simultaneously be confirmed as full professors in the university.
