= Junaiti Sahar =

Indonesian nurse and university administrator

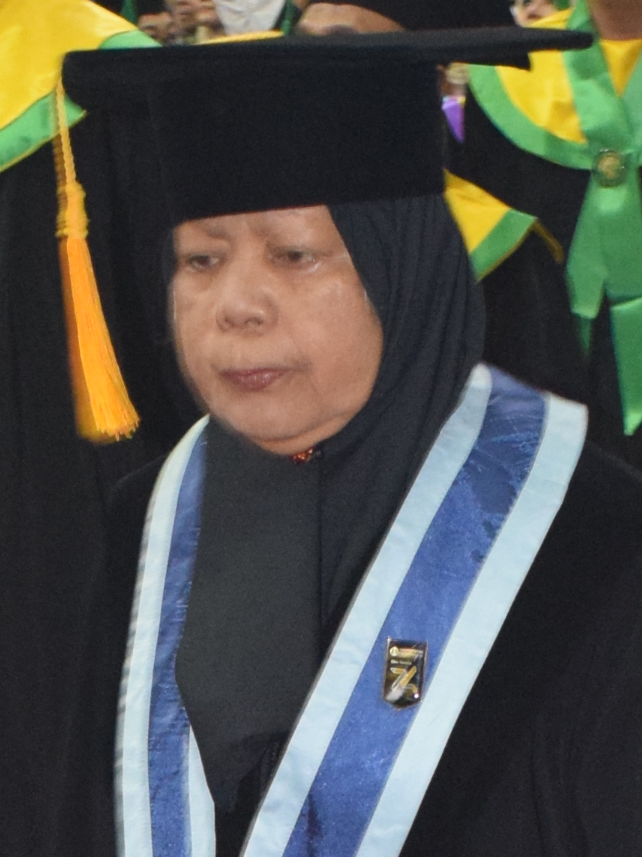

Dean of the Faculty of Nursing of the University of Indonesia
- In office 8 January 2014 – 8 January 2018
- Preceded by: Dewi Irawati
- Succeeded by: Agus Setiawan

Personal details
- Born: January 15, 1957 (age 69) Tanjungbatu Kundur, Central Sumatra, Indonesia
- Spouse: Suhatman Samin
- Education: Department of Health Nursing Academy (A.Md.); National Institute of Public Administration (Dra.); University of Indonesia (S.Kp., Prof.); University of Sydney (M.App.Sc.); Queensland University of Technology (Ph.D.)

Junaiti Sahar (born 15 January 1957) is an Indonesian nurse and university administrator who served as the dean of the nursing faculty of the University of Indonesia (UI) from 2014 to 2018. She was appointed as a full professor in nursing on 1 June 2020.

== Early life ==
Junaiti was born on 15 January 1957 in Tanjungbatu Kundur, Central Sumatra, as the daughter of Muhammad Sahar and Rajuna Rasyiddin. She spent most of her childhood in Tanjungbatu Kundur and completed her primary and junior high school education there. She then moved to Payakumbuh in West Sumatra, where she finished her high school studies at the 1st Payakumbuh State High School in 1975.

After finishing her basic studies, Junaiti studied nursing at the Department of Health Nursing Academy in Jakarta. He received a diplomas in nursing from the academy in 1979. She received her bachelor's degree in administration from the National Institute of Public Administration in 1987 and a bachelor's degree in nursing from the University of Indonesia in 1989. She continued her studies to the Sydney University, where she received a master's degree in community health nursing in 1992.

== Academic career ==
Shortly after completing her studies at the nursing academy, Junaiti began to work as a nurse at the Dr. Cipto Mangunkusumo Hospital. She started lecturing at UI's nursing department on 1 January 1992 and was appointed as the chief of employee, administration, and general affairs of the department in 1994. The department, previously under the auspices of the medicine faculty, was established as a separate faculty in late 1995. Junaiti's position was elevated to second deputy dean for administrative and financial affairs, and he served in the position until 1999. Around the same time, from 1998 to 1999 Junaiti was also appointed as the head of the emergency operating room in Dr. Cipto Mangunkusumo Hospital.

At the end of her tenure as deputy dean, Junaiti was sent by the-then dean of the nursing faculty, Azrul Azwar, to pursue doctoral studies at the Queensland University of Technology. She received her doctoral degree from the university in 2003. Upon returning to Indonesia, Junaiti was appointed as the head of the undergraduate and profession program. A year later, Junaiti was selected as the chair of the faculty's academic senate and ethics committee. Junaiti was then transferred to head the masters and specialization department from 2005 to 2007.

Junaiti returned to her old post as deputy dean in 2008, where she served for a five-year term under dean Dewi Irawati. During this period, Dewi and other deans in UI issued a motion of no confidence to the-then rector Gumilar Rusliwa Somantri, which resulted in her dismissal from the position. The controversial decision appointed Junaiti as the faculty's acting dean. The decision was later cancelled following a meeting between the university's board of trustees and the minister of education.

On 8 January 2014, Junaiti was installed as the new dean of the faculty. During her tenure, the faculty cooperated with the Jakarta regional government to provide healthcare services for residents, particularly those living in slum areas. The initiative, which involves students and faculty members, includes health screenings, consultations, and referrals to health centers if needed. The program is integrated with the practical training of nursing students, including professional, master's, and specialist students, addressing health issues across different age groups.

In 2016, Junaiti criticized the health minister's decision to dissolve the directorate of nursing services from the department. Junaiti argued that the dissolution weakened policy direction for nurses and that the department did not pay enough attention to the well-being and career of nurses in Indonesia.

Junaiti ended his tenure as dean in 2018 and was replaced by Agus Setiawan, who was previously the head of the nursing faculty's administrative center under her. Junaiti was then entrusted to head the faculty's doctoral programme. On 1 June 2020, she was appointed by the minister of education as a full professor in nursing, making her the 13th nurse to be appointed as a full professor. Her inaugural speech, titled The Role of Community Nurses in Increasing Family Resilience with the Elderly in the Era of Adapting to New Habits, was read on 27 March 2021. In her speech, Junaiti emphasized the crucial role of community nurses in enhancing family resilience, particularly for the elderly, during the COVID-19 pandemic. She highlighted the importance of community nurses acting as providers, educators, and facilitators to prepare families for the new normal and improve overall health outcomes.

== Personal life ==
Junaiti is married to Suhatman Samin, who worked as a teacher.
