= Elly Nurachmah =

Indonesian nurse and university administrator

Dean of the Faculty of Nursing of the University of Indonesia
- In office 2000 – 3 April 2008
- Preceded by: Azrul Azwar
- Succeeded by: Dewi Irawati

Personal details
- Born: August 17, 1948 (age 78) Bogor, State of Pasundan
- Spouse: Alexchan Tanjung
- Education: Department of Health Nursing Academy (A.Md.); National Institute of Public Administration (Dra.); University of Indonesia (S.Kp., Prof.); University of Sydney (M.App.Sc.); The Catholic University of America (Ph.D.)

Academic background
- Thesis: The effect of participation in a support group on body image, intimacy, and self-efficacy of Indonesian women with breast cancer (1998)
- Doctoral advisor: Elizabeth A. McFarlane

Academic work
- Discipline: Nursing
- Sub-discipline: Cardiovascular and oncology nursing

Elly Nurachmah (born 17 August 1948) is an Indonesian nurse and university administrator who served as the dean of the nursing faculty of the University of Indonesia (UI) from 2000 to 2008. She was the first nurse in Indonesia to be appointed as a professor.

== Early life ==
Elly was born on 17 August 1948 in Bogor, which at that time was part of the State of Pasundan. He was the daughter of Oskar Kusumaningrat, former police chief of Banten, and Jumariah Wiraatmadja. She completed her primary education at the Regina Pacis primary school in 1961. She then moved to Serang, where he completed her secondary education at the Mardi Yuwana junior high school in 1964 and the 1st Serang State High School in 1967.

After finishing her basic studies, Elly studied nursing at the Department of Health Nursing Academy in Jakarta. He received a diploma in nursing from the academy in 1971. She received her bachelor's degree in administration from the National Institute of Public Administration in 1983 and a bachelor's degree in nursing from the University of Indonesia in 1988. She continued her studies to the Sydney University, where she received a master's degree in medical surgery nursing in 1990. While in Australia, Elly practiced nursing at the Canterbury Hospital and Concord Repatriation General Hospital.

== Career ==
Elly began her career as a nurse at the Dr. Cipto Mangunkusumo Hospital in 1971. He worked in the hospital as a candidate civil servant for several months before being elevated to a permanent civil servant in 1972. From 1976 to 1983, Elly was entrusted to head the cardiac catheterization laboratory in the hospital. The next year, she was transferred to the Department of Health, where she headed the rehabilitative nursing subdirectorate in the nursing directorate for a year. She was assigned to the directorate as a nonjob civil servant while pursuing her bachelor's and master studies.

After completing her master studies, Elly began lecturing at the nursing major of the University of Indonesia. She then continued her studies at the Catholic University of America, where she received her doctoral degree in oncological nursing in 1998. His doctoral thesis was titled The effect of participation in support group on body image, intimacy, and self efficacy of Indonesia women with breast cancer. During her doctoral studies, Elly worked as a nurse in Manor Care Health Services.

Upon returning to Indonesia, Elly was entrusted to head the master's program of the nursing faculty. Two years later, she became the dean of the nursing faculty and served for two terms until 3 April 2008. Under his leadership, the faculty engaged in cooperation with nursing faculties of other universities, such as the Curtin University, Chulalongkorn University, and the Binawan Health Institute. Elly was instrumental in developing the nursing faculty at the Riau University. By the Department of Health, she was sent to represent the department in various conferences and meetings abroad. Aside from teaching nursing at the University of Indonesia, she also taught at the Gadjah Mada University and other private health institutes.

Elly oversaw the establishment of the Association of Indonesian Nursing Education Institutions (AIPNI), whom she was elected as chairwoman from 2001 to 2013. Under the directive of the Ministry of Education, AIPNI developed a competency-based nursing curriculum for universities in Indonesia. She was also a member of the Sigma Theta Tau, Oncology Nursing Society, Indonesian Cardiovascular Nurses Association, and the National Union of Indonesian Nurses.

On 1 February 2004, Elly was appointed as a full professor in nursing, making her the first nurse in Indonesia to receive the academic rank. Her inaugural speech, which was read on 22 May 2004, discussed about the history of nursing education in Indonesia as well as its future prospect.

After becoming the dean for two terms, Elly became the head of the doctoral programme of the faculty. She also became the secretary of the Independent Accreditation Institution for Indonesian Higher Health Education.

== Personal life ==
Elly is married to Alexchan Tanjung and has three children.
