= Mahmud Sudibandriyo =

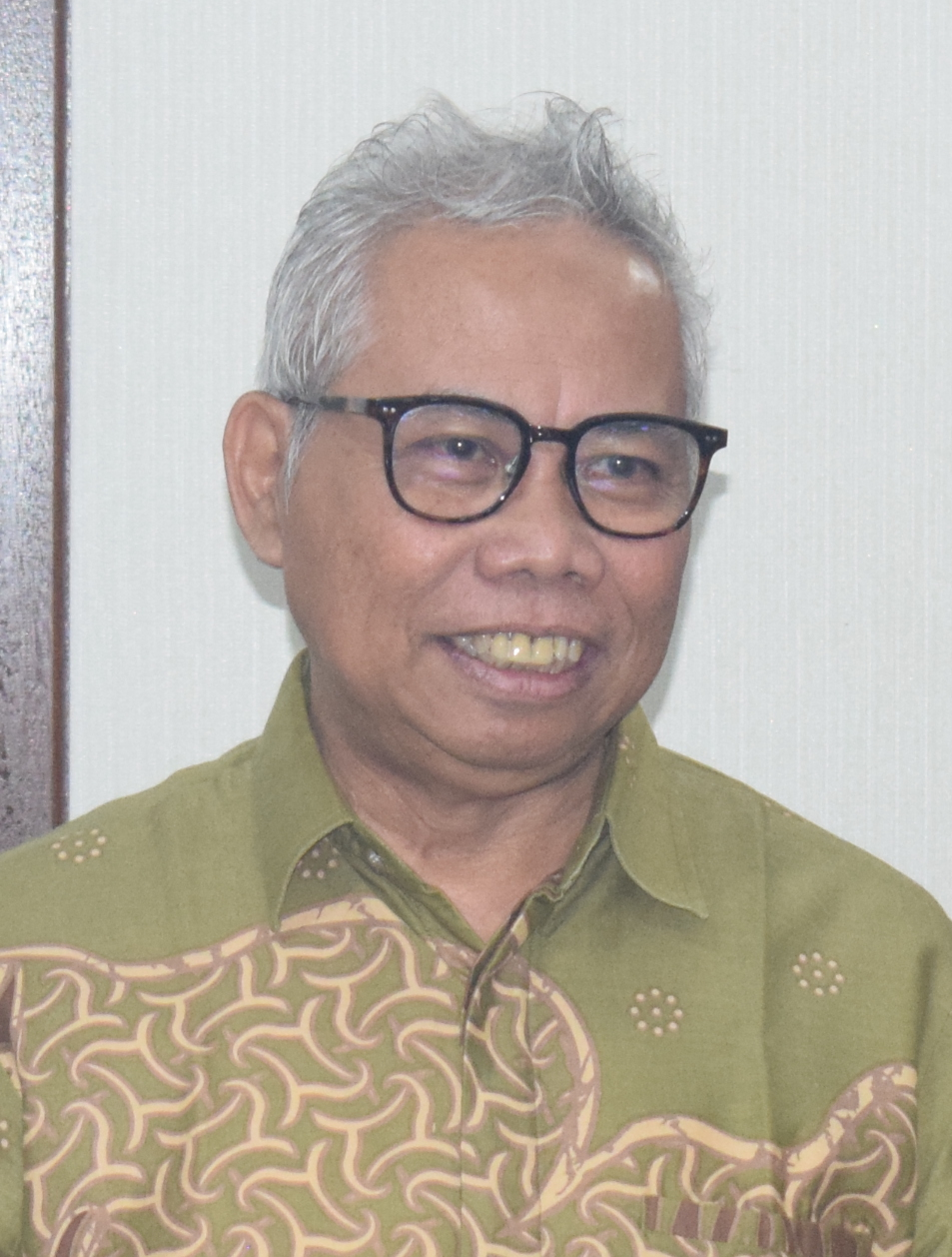

Deputy Rector for Academic Affairs of the University of Indonesia (Note: As Deputy Rector for Academic and Student Affairs until March 2026.)
- Incumbent
- Assumed office 16 December 2024
- Preceded by: Abdul Haris; Dedi Priadi (acting)

Dean of the Faculty of Engineering of the University of Indonesia
- Acting
- In office 4 December 2024 – 31 January 2025
- Preceded by: Heri Hermansyah
- Succeeded by: Kemas Ridwan Kurniawan

Personal details
- Born: August 18, 1963 (age 63) Pati, Central Java, Indonesia
- Education: Bandung Institute of Technology (Ir.); Oklahoma State University (M.Sc., Ph.D.); University of Indonesia (Prof.)

Mahmud Sudibandriyo (born 18 August 1963) is an Indonesian lecturer, scientist, and university administrator. He is the current deputy rector for academic and student affairs of the University of Indonesia (UI), serving since 16 December 2024. He was previously the deputy dean of the Engineering Faculty for Resources, Ventures, and General Administration from 2022 to 2024.

== Early life and education ==
Mahmud was born on 18 August 1963 in Pati, Central Java. Upon completing high school, Mahmud studied chemical engineering at the Bandung Institute of Technology. He graduated in 1986 and continued his postgraduate studies at the Oklahoma State University. He received his master's degree in 1991 and his doctorate in 2003.

== Academic career ==
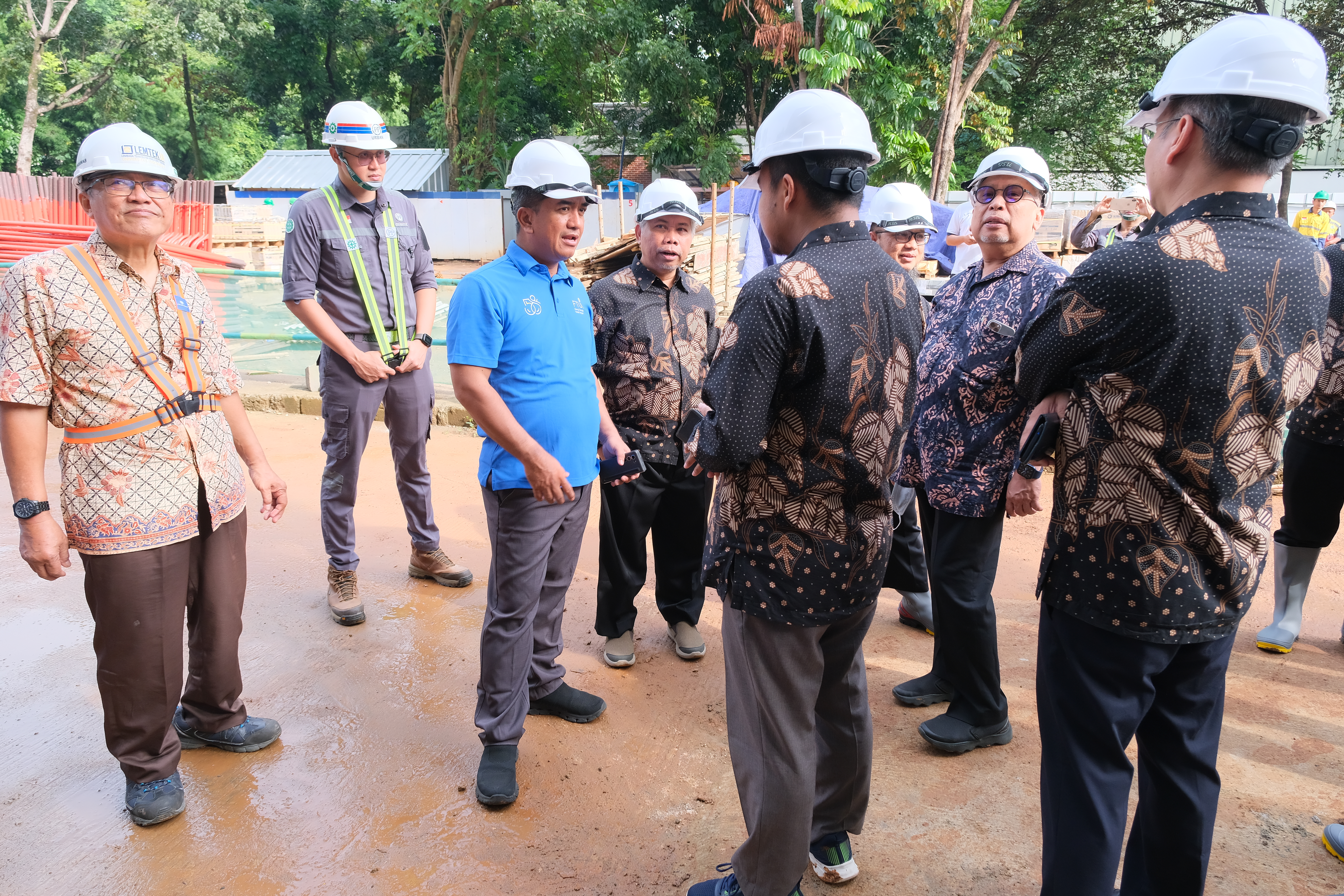
Mahmud (fourth from left) observing a construction at UI's engineering faculty in 2024.

Mahmud began his teaching career in UI a year after he graduated from the Bandung Institute of Technology. Upon completing his master's studies, in 1995 he became the secretary of UI's gas and petrochemical engineering department under Andy Noorsaman, who would later become the director general of electricity. While pursuing his doctoral degree, Mahmud worked as a teaching assistant and research assistant at Oklahoma State University, School of Chemical Engineering. He returned to the engineering department as the vice head in 2004. Mahmud became the engineering faculty's education manager in 2006 and the chief of administrative affairs for the faculty's Salemba campus office in 2007.

On 19 June 2013, Mahmud was appointed as a full professor in the thermodynamics of adsorption. In his inaugural speech, titled Adsorption: Theory and Application, Mahmud discussed the theory and applications of adsorption, including its use in gas storage and heat exchangers. After obtaining full professorship, Mahmud was appointed by the engineering faculty's dean, Dedi Priadi, as the head of the Academic Quality Development Unit. Mahmud was then elected as the chairman of the faculty's academic senate.

On 14 February 2022, the-then newly appointed dean of the engineering faculty Heri Hermansyah appointed Mahmud Sudibandriyo as the deputy dean for resources, ventures, and general administration. Despite his initial reluctance, Mahmud accepted the offer after he was repeatedly persuaded by Heri.

On 4 December 2024, Heri Hermansyah was installed as the new rector of the University of Indonesia following his victory in the September 2024 rector election. Mahmud became the acting dean of the engineering faculty, replacing Heri. Twelve days later, Mahmud was appointed as the deputy rector for academic and student affairs by Heri Hermansyah. As acting dean, Mahmud oversaw the establishment of a skill center at the engineering faculty in cooperation with Alibaba Cloud.

As deputy rector, Mahmud oversaw academic collaboration with the Massachusetts Institute of Technology-based Abdul Latif Jameel Poverty Action Lab and Moscow State University. In February 2025, Mahmud announced that the university has proposed a tuition hike to the Ministry of Higher Education, Science, and Technology. He stated that the hike was reasonable and was made to adjust to the learning process in each major.

Mahmud (second from right) as acting rector with the Director General of Islamic Education, Amien Suyitno (second from left), in November 2026.

In December 2025, discussions regarding the transfer of the students portofolio under Mahmud's purview began, and on 23 January 2026 rector Heri Hermansyah issued a decree which officiated the transfer of portofolio, effectively reducing Mahmud's responsibility from six different directorate to four directorates and the student admission office. The changes, which was legally effective since 31 January 2026, was implemented beginning in March that year.
