= Nurtami Soedarsono =

Indonesian dentist and researcher (born 1974)

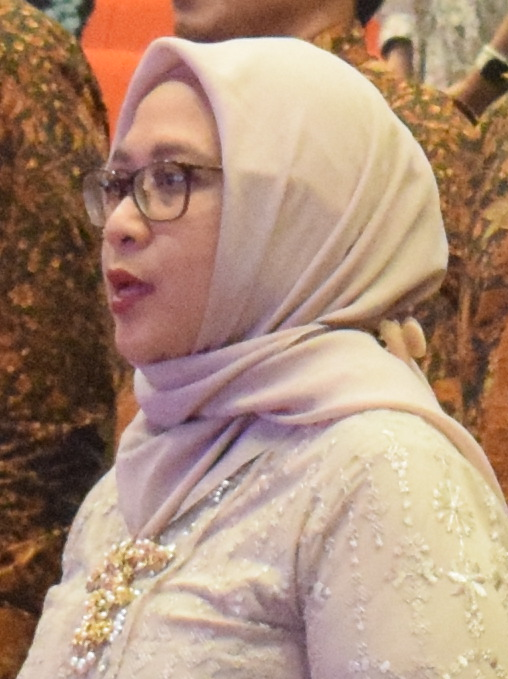

Deputy Rector for Research and Innovation of the University of Indonesia
- In office 21 October 2020 – 16 December 2024
- Preceded by: Abdul Haris
- Succeeded by: Hamdi Muluk

Personal details
- Born: 15 June 1974 (age 51) Jakarta, Indonesia
- Education: University of Indonesia (drg., Sp.OF(K)); Tokyo Medical and Dental University (Ph.D.)

Nurtami Soedarsono (born 15 June 1974) is an Indonesian dentist, academic, and researcher in forensic dentistry. She served as the Deputy Rector for Research and Innovation at the University of Indonesia from 2020 to 2024.

== Early life and education ==
Nurtami was born in Jakarta on 15 June 1974. She is the youngest of three siblings and the daughter of an economics lecturer at the University of Indonesia. Nurtami has developed an interest in health sciences and the arts since her childhood. After finishing high school, she decided to study dentistry at the University of Indonesia. Her undergraduate thesis discussed forensic dentistry, a topic that was not popular among her peers at the time.

Upon graduating in 1997, she assisted in post-mortem identification cases at the Cipto Mangunkusumo Hospital, mentored by forensic expert Mun’im Idris. Due to her frequent late hours and involvement in disaster identification, Nurtami was questioned by her parents, although they later supported her as her work was often linked to major national incidents.

After being accepted for a doctorate in dentistry at the Tokyo Medical and Dental University in 2001, Nurtami studied Japanese for six months before beginning her studies at the Department of Molecular Pathology. Her doctoral advisors were Minoru Takagi and Akira Yamaguchi. She also conducted research on the human genome and the genetic background of several diseases at Riken in Yokohama under the supervision of Yoshiyuki Sakaki and Toshio Kojima as team leader. She graduated from the Tokyo Medical and Dental University in 2006.

== Career ==
After obtaining her doctorate, Nurtami returned to Indonesia and began working as a lecturer at the University of Indonesia's dentistry faculty, alongside continuing her research in forensic dentistry as well as pathology. As a forensic researcher, she often collaborated with pathologists, anthropologists, DNA experts, and police forensic teams in identifying bodies. She became a forensic consultant for the newly established national police's DNA forensic laboratory in 2007 and a visiting scholar at the Columbia University in 2009. She, along with fellow dentistry forensic Astiti Handayani, was involved in the disaster victim identification operation of the 2012 Mount Salak Sukhoi Superjet crash.

Nurtami held managerial positions in the dentistry faculty since her return from Japan in 2006. She served as the faculty's student manager from 2006 to 2008, where she was responsible for the welfare of students and managing exchange programs and student activities. Her stint continued with her appointment as the assistant to the head of the faculty's master's program from 2011 to 2014. On 10 January 2014, Nurtami assumed office as the faculty's second deputy dean, responsible for resources, venture, and general administration. She served until 2 August 2018 and was then appointed as the head of the faculty's master program.

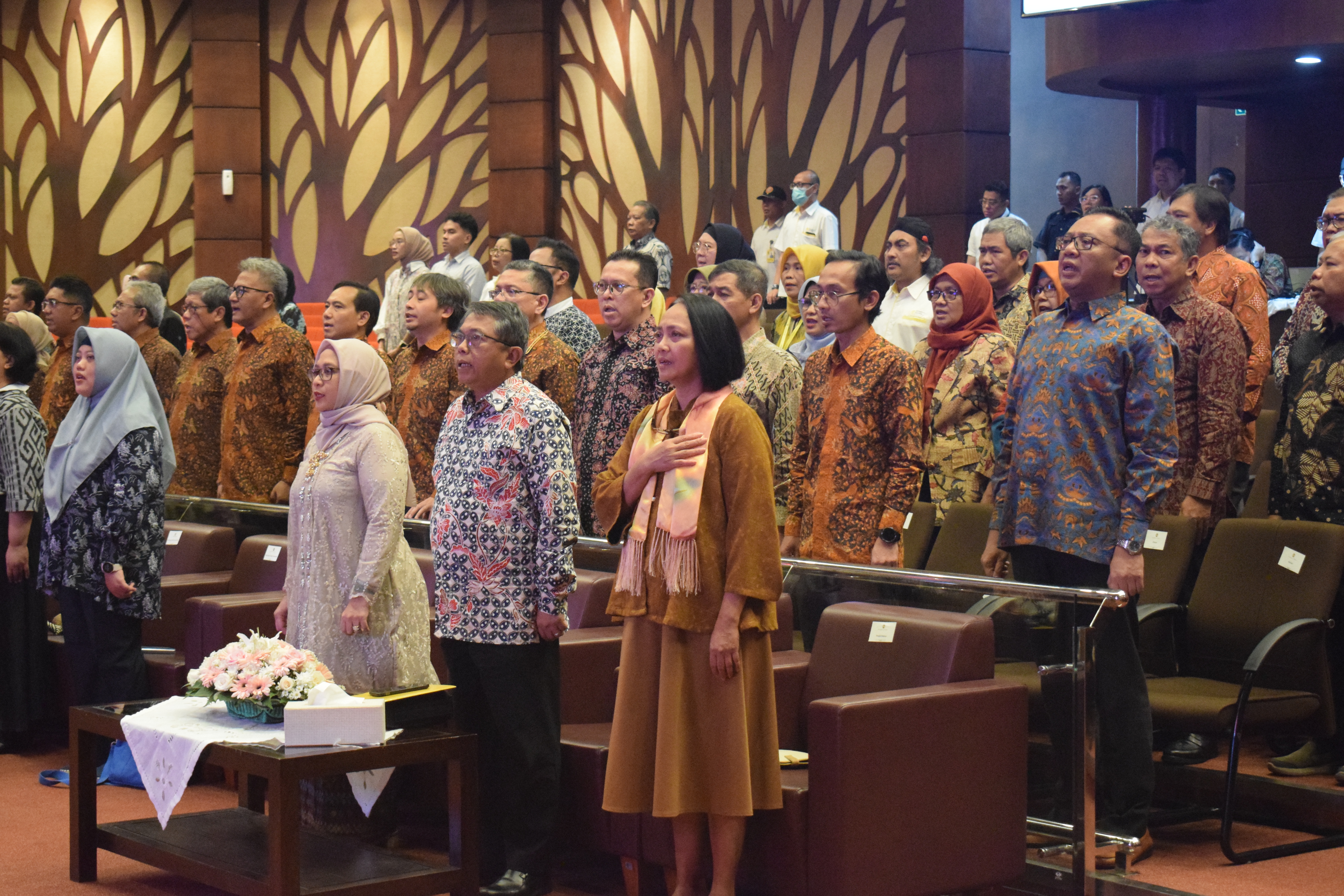
Nurtami (second from left) with other deputy rectors on her right in 2024.

On 21 October 2020, Nurtami was installed as the university's third deputy rector, responsible for research and innovation. During her tenure, the university held innovation awards and festivals to support inventions and startups from the general public. She conducted visits representing the university in Switzerland and the Netherlands and signed a number of cooperation agreements on research and innovation, including with the state oil company Pertamina on business incubators and the Nusantara Capital City Authority. She also oversaw the development of electric buses for public transport in the university. Her tenure ended with the appointment of Hamdi Muluk on 16 December 2024.

On 14 October 2024, Nurtami became a member of the Indonesian Health Council and the chairman of the forensic dentistry collegium after winning an internal election with 13 votes.
