= Muhammad Anis =

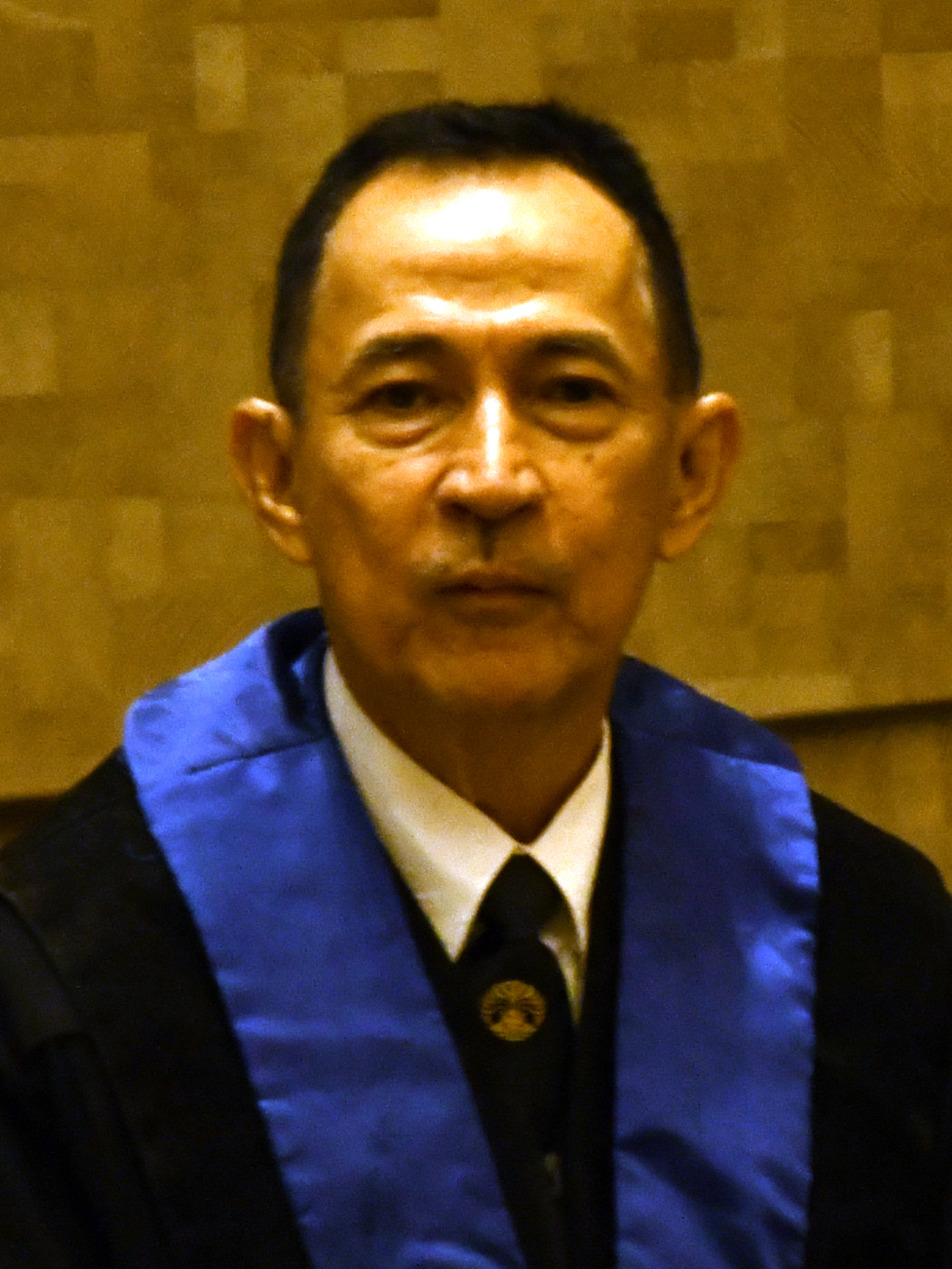
- Anis in 2024

Rector of the University of Indonesia
- In office 4 December 2014 – 4 December 2019
- Preceded by: Bambang Wibawarta (acting)
- Succeeded by: Ari Kuncoro
- In office 17 May 2013 – 2 October 2014
- Preceded by: Djoko Santoso (acting)
- Succeeded by: Bambang Wibawarta (acting)

Personal details
- Born: June 26, 1957 Jakarta, Indonesia
- Education: University of Indonesia (Ir., Prof.); University of Sheffield (M.Met., Dr.)

Muhammad Anis (born 26 June 1957) is an Indonesian engineer and academic administrator who became UI's rector from 2014 until 2019. He was previously the university's academic director from 2003 from 2007 and first deputy rector from 2007 until 2013.

== Early life and education ==
Muhammad Anis was born on 26 June 1957 in Jakarta, Indonesia. He attended Yayasan Perguruan Cikini as a child and graduated from SMA Negeri 4 Jakarta in 1976. In 1977, he enrolled in the Metallurgy Department at the Faculty of Engineering, University of Indonesia (FTUI). In August, 1983, he became the first student in his cohort to graduate from the Metallurgy Department. In 1988, Anis earnt a master's degree in metallurgy from the University of Sheffield. In 1991, he completed a doctoral degree.

== Academic career ==
Anis initially worked as a teaching assistant in the Metallurgy Department at FTUI, but in 1984 began to work as an engineer in the private sector. FTUI asked him back, and in January 1985, Anis became a lecturer in the Metallurgy Department and, soon after, the department's secretary. He left in 1986 to attend graduate school in the United Kingdom. Anis returned to FTUI in 1992, where he was tasked with creating a postgraduate metallurgy degree program. With Anis as coordinator, the program opened in August 1992. From 1993 to 1997, Anis worked as an assistant dean one, and then until 2000 as assistant dean five.

Anis returned to lecturing in the early 2000s, and was elected as the Head of the Metallurgy Department. He changed the name of the department to Department of Metallurgy and Materials, and established the Centre for Material Processing and Failure Analysis (CMPFA). After 2002, he was promoted to director of education at the university by rector Usman Chatib Warsa. After 2007, he was appointed deputy rector for academic and student affairs by Gumilar Rusliwa Somantri.
