= Agus Setiawan =

Indonesian nurse and university administrator

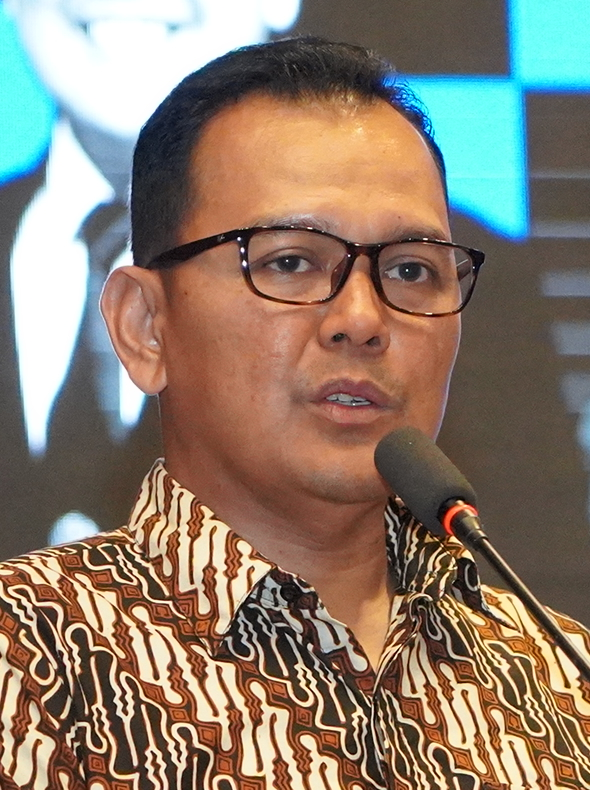
- Setiawan in 2025

Deputy Rector for Infrastructure and Facility of the University of Indonesia
- Incumbent
- Assumed office 16 December 2024
- Preceded by: Dedi Priadi (Human Resources and Assets)

Dean of the Faculty of Nursing of the University of Indonesia
- In office 8 January 2018 (Note: Acting since 16 December 2024) – 31 January 2025
- Preceded by: Junaiti Sahar
- Succeeded by: Tutik Sri Haryati

Personal details
- Born: August 5, 1975 (age 51)
- Education: University of Indonesia (S.Kp.); University of Technology Sydney (M.N., D.N.)

Agus Setiawan (born 5 August 1975) is an Indonesian nurse and university administrator who is currently the deputy rector for infrastructure and facility of the University of Indonesia (UI), serving in the position since 16 December 2024. He was also the dean of the university's nursing faculty since 2018.

== Education ==
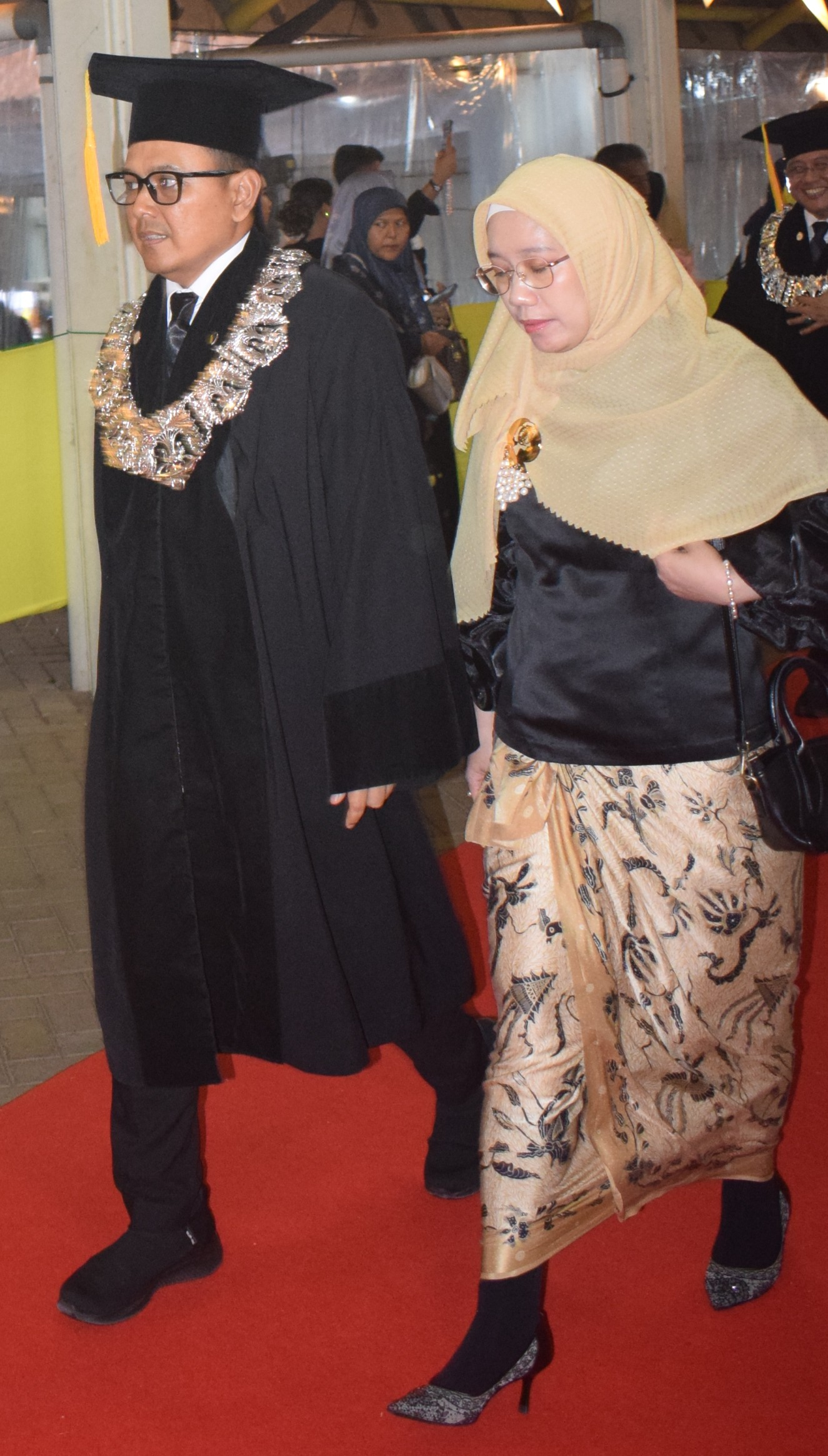
Agus Setiawan and his wife.

Agus was born in Jakarta on 5 August 1975. He received his bachelor's degree in nursing from the University of Indonesia in 1999. He then continued his studies at the University of Technology Sydney, where he received his master's degree in 2006 and his doctoral degree in 2014.

== Academic career ==
Agus began his lecturing career as a lecturer at UI's community health department of the nursing faculty. As a lecturer, Agus specializes in community-based intervention, child health, access to health care, human resource for health, and health inequalities. In 2004, Agus was involved as part of a community development project between the University of Indonesia and the Memorial University of Newfoundland. From 2009 to 2010, Agus briefly worked as a human resource officer for the World Health Organization's country office in Indonesia. From 2014 to 2017, Agus was the chief of the nursing faculty's administrative center.

Agus is a member of various professional and educational nursing organizations, such as the Task Force for ASEAN Joint Coordinating Committee on Nursing, Asia Pacific Alliance of Nursing Education, Southeast and East Asian Nursing Education and Research Network (SEANERN), and the Association of Indonesian Community Health Nurses. He was the president of the Indonesian chapter of the Sigma Theta Tau (Sigma Alpha Beta Lambda at-Large Chapter #609) and the chairman of the Association of Indonesian Nursing Education Institution (AIPNI, Asosiasi Institusi Pendidikan Ners Indonesia) since 2021. Previously, he was AIPNI's secretary general and chair of the association's fifth region.

On 22 November 2017, Agus was selected as the new dean of UI's nursing faculty. In his presentation, Agus aimed at making the faculty as a leading center for nursing education in Southeast Asia and improving the quality of nursing graduates to compete in the ASEAN region. Agus plans to address several weaknesses at FIK UI, such as the imbalance between the number of lecturers and students, lack of coordination, limited facilities, and insufficient professional practice supervisors. He was installed for the position on 8 January 2018. During his tenure, the faculty was officially accredited by the ASEAN University Network and the International Organization for Standardization and the faculty's journal began to be indexed by Scopus.

During Agus's first term, the faculty was involved in combatting the spread of the COVID-19 pandemic. The faculty established a crisis center to educate the general public regarding the pandemic and provide mental support. The center also trained volunteers from all over Indonesia. The faculty also trained nurses to help limit the spread of the virus in cooperation with institutions such as the Coordinating Ministry for Human Development and Culture. In December 2020, the faculty held an international conference involving nursing academicians from around the world to address the-then ongoing pandemic. He also served as the coordinator for deans in the university's health sciences cluster from 2020 to 2023.

Agus was re-selected for a second term on 16 November 2021 and was installed for the position on 7 January 2022. In 2023, the faculty's undergraduate program was officially accredited by the Akkreditierungsagentur für Studiengänge im Bereich Gesundheit und Soziales (AHPGS, Accreditation Agency in Health and Social Sciences). On 1 October 2023, Agus was promoted to the rank of full professor. His inaugural speech as a full professor, which was read on 8 August 2025, emphasizes the strategic role of community health nurses in shaping a healthy Indonesian generation by 2045.

Agus ran as a candidate for UI's rector in mid-2024, but failed to pass the final selection process prior to an election by the board of trustees. Heri Hermansyah from the engineering faculty was elected as UI's new rector, who then appointed Agus as acting deputy rector for academic and student affairs to replace the outgoing acting deputy Dedi Priadi. On 16 December 2024, Agus was appointed as the deputy rector for infrastructure and facility of the University of Indonesia. As part of his duties as deputy rector, on 2 January 2025 Agus became a member of the supervisory board of the University of Indonesia's hospital, representing the rector.

== Works ==
- Ratnawati, D; Setiawan, A; Widyatuti; Hastono, SP; Siregar, T; Anggraini, NV (March 2024). "Related factors to HIV/AIDS prevention behavior of adolescents in Jakarta's high school". International Journal of Public Health Science. 13 (1): 87–97. doi:10.11591/ijphs.v13i1.23245. ISSN 2252-8806.
- Setiawan, A; Wati, DNK; Hassan, H; Sharmil, H; Sukihananto, S; Syamsir, SB; Rachmawati, U; Eriska, W (15 June 2024). "Insights from a multi-country study: Lessons for future nursing education from community clinical practice amid the COVID-19 pandemic". Heliyon. 10 (11) e32486. Bibcode:2024Heliy..1032486S. doi:10.1016/j.heliyon.2024.e32486. PMC 11219488. PMID 38961994.
- Setiawan, A; Sahar, J; Santoso, B; Mansyur, M; Syamsir, SB (2024). "Coping Mechanisms Utilized by Drug Addicts in Overcoming Challenges During the Recovery Process: A Qualitative Meta-Synthesis". Journal of Preventive Medicine and Public Health. doi:10.3961/jpmph.24.042. eISSN 2233-4521. ISSN 1975-8375. PMC 11164602.
- Setiawan, A; Fitriyani, P; Istifada, R; Shorey, S (2021). "Healthcare Providers and Caregivers' Perspective on the Quality of Child Health Services in Urban Indonesia: A Mixed-Methods Study". International Journal of Environmental Research and Public Health. 18 (15): 8047. doi:10.3390/ijerph18158047. PMC 8345802. PMID 34360337.
- Setiawan, A; Christiani, Y (2018). "Integrated Health Post for Child Health (Posyandu) As A Community-Based Program in Indonesia: An Exploratory Study". Jurnal Keperawatan Indonesia. 21 (3): 150–158. doi:10.7454/jki.v21i3.600.
- Setiawan, A; Dawson, A (2017). "Strengthening the primary care workforce to deliver community case management for child health in rural Indonesia". Australian Health Review. 42 (5): 536–541. doi:10.1071/AH17092. PMID 28965537.
- Setiawan, A; Dignam, D; Waters, C; Dawson, A (2016). "Improving Access to Child Health Care in Indonesia Through Community Case Management". Maternal and Child Health Journal. 20 (11): 2254–2260. doi:10.1007/s10995-016-2149-z. PMID 27449650.
