= Dewi Irawati =

Indonesian nurse (born 1952)

Chairwoman of the Indonesian National Nurse Association
- In office 30 May 2010 – 10 May 2015
- Preceded by: Achir Yani Syuhaimie Hamid
- Succeeded by: Harif Fadhilah

Dean of the Faculty of Nursing of the University of Indonesia
- In office 3 April 2008 – 8 January 2014
- Preceded by: Elly Nurachmah
- Succeeded by: Junaiti Sahar

Personal details
- Born: June 1, 1952 (age 73) Tanjung Karang, South Sumatra, Indonesia
- Education: Department of Health Nursing Academy (A.Md.); University of Malaya; University of the Philippines Manila (M.A.); Chulalongkorn University (Ph.D.)

Dewi Irawati (born 1 June 1952) is an Indonesian nurse who was the chairwoman of the Indonesian National Nurses Association from 2010 to 2015. She was also a lecturer at the University of Indonesia Faculty of Nursing and served as the faculty's dean from 2008 to 2014. She was noted for her role in advocating the Nursing Bill, which was enacted into law in 2014.

== Early life and education ==
Dewi was born on 1 June 1952 in Bandar Lampung (then Tanjung Karang). Upon completing her education from the Department of Health's Nursing Academy in 1974, Dewi received her diploma from the University of Malaya Post Basic Nursing Education in 1980. She obtained her master's degree in nursing from the University of the Philippines Manila in 1987 and doctorate in nursing from the Chulalongkorn University in 2006.

== Career ==
Dewi began her career as a nurse at the Dr. Cipto Mangunkusumo Hospital in 1975. She became a clinical instructor at her almamater, the Department of Health's Nursing Academy in 1980 before moving to teach nursing at the University of Indonesia's Faculty of Medicine in 1986. In 1990, she became the nursing department's academic chief. After the nursing department was elevated to a faculty in 1996, Dewi became the chief of the faculty's research development agency under dean Azrul Azwar. After Azrul Azwar was replaced by Elly Nurachmah in 2000, Elly appointed Dewi as her deputy for academic affairs. She served for two terms, being reappointed to the position on 8 April 2004.

=== Dean of the University of Indonesia Nursing Faculty ===
On 27 March 2008, Dewi was appointed as the faculty's dean, setting aside two other candidates in a selection process held by the university's rector. She assumed office on 3 April 2008 in an inauguration ceremony. Dewi oversaw the establishment of a doctorate nursing program, which was the first of its kind in Indonesia. Dewi appointed her predecessor, Elly, to chair the new program. In October 2009, the faculty held an international nursing conference, opened by the Director General of Higher Education and involved deans of nursing faculties abroad.

In July 2012, Dewi and other deans were dismissed by rector Gumilar Rusliwa Somantri. Gumilar stated that the dismissal was due to the expiry of their terms. The deans viewed their dismissal as unjust and filed a letter of complaint to education Minister Mohammad Nuh, explaining their motion of no confidence against Gumilar. The deans were later replaced by their deputies as acting dean, with Dewi being replaced by her first deputy Junaiti Sahar. Gumilar's decision was reversed following a meeting between the university's board of trustees and the minister of education in August that year. Dewi was replaced by Junaiti in a permanent capacity on 8 January 2014.

=== Chairwoman of the Indonesian National Nurses Association ===
Dewi was elected as the chairwoman of the Indonesian National Nurses Association, the sole organization for nurses in Indonesia, at its eighth congress held in Balikpapan from 27 to 30 May 2010. She had previously served as the organization's chairwoman for nursing science and technology affairs and the chairwoman of the Nursing Ethics Honor Council.

Dewi was responsible in advocating a nursing bill. According to Dewi, the lack of a regulatory framework for nurses caused challenges to nurse recruitment, legal risks, and limited international competitiveness. Although the House of Representative has placed the bill as one of its priority bills since 2005, no further actions were taken up until Dewi's leadership, causing protests from the nurses.

Under her leadership, the association staged protests in front of the parliament building in 2010 and 2012, urging the government to speed up the discussion of the bill. In 2013, the organization staged its final protest, threatening a nationwide strike if the bill was not passed immediately. Dewi herself was involved in negotiations and discussions with the parliament regarding the bill. After receiving support from the Indonesian Democratic Party of Struggle and the Prosperous Justice Party parliamentary group, the bill was passed on 26 September 2014 and was enacted on 17 October. Dewi's term ended in May 2015.

== Later life ==
Dewi continued her academic and organizational tenure after her term as dean and chairwoman ended. From 2015 to 2020, she became a member of the Indonesian National Nurses Association Advisory Council and the secretary of the Community Accreditation Institute for Health Colleges.
