= Kemas Ridwan Kurniawan =

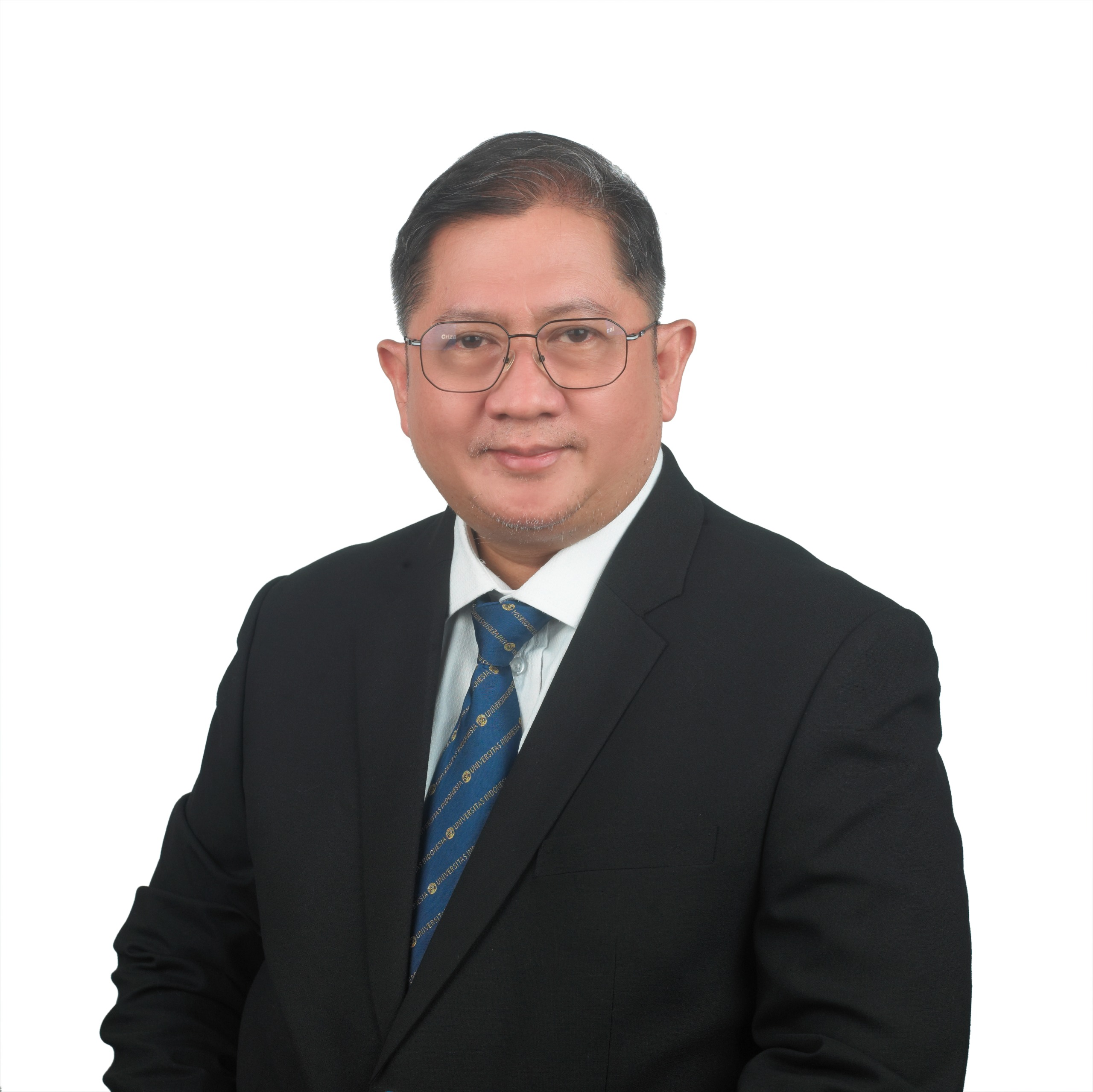

Dean of the Faculty of Engineering of the University of Indonesia
- Incumbent
- Assumed office 31 January 2025
- Preceded by: Heri Hermansyah; Mahmud Sudibandriyo (acting)

Chairman of the Jakarta Regional Research Council
- In office 2019–2022
- Preceded by: Dadang Solihin
- Succeeded by: vacant

Personal details
- Born: January 28, 1971 (age 55) Muntok, Bangka, South Sumatra, Indonesia
- Education: University of Indonesia (S.T., Prof.); The Bartlett Faculty of the Built Environment (M.Sc., Ph.D.)

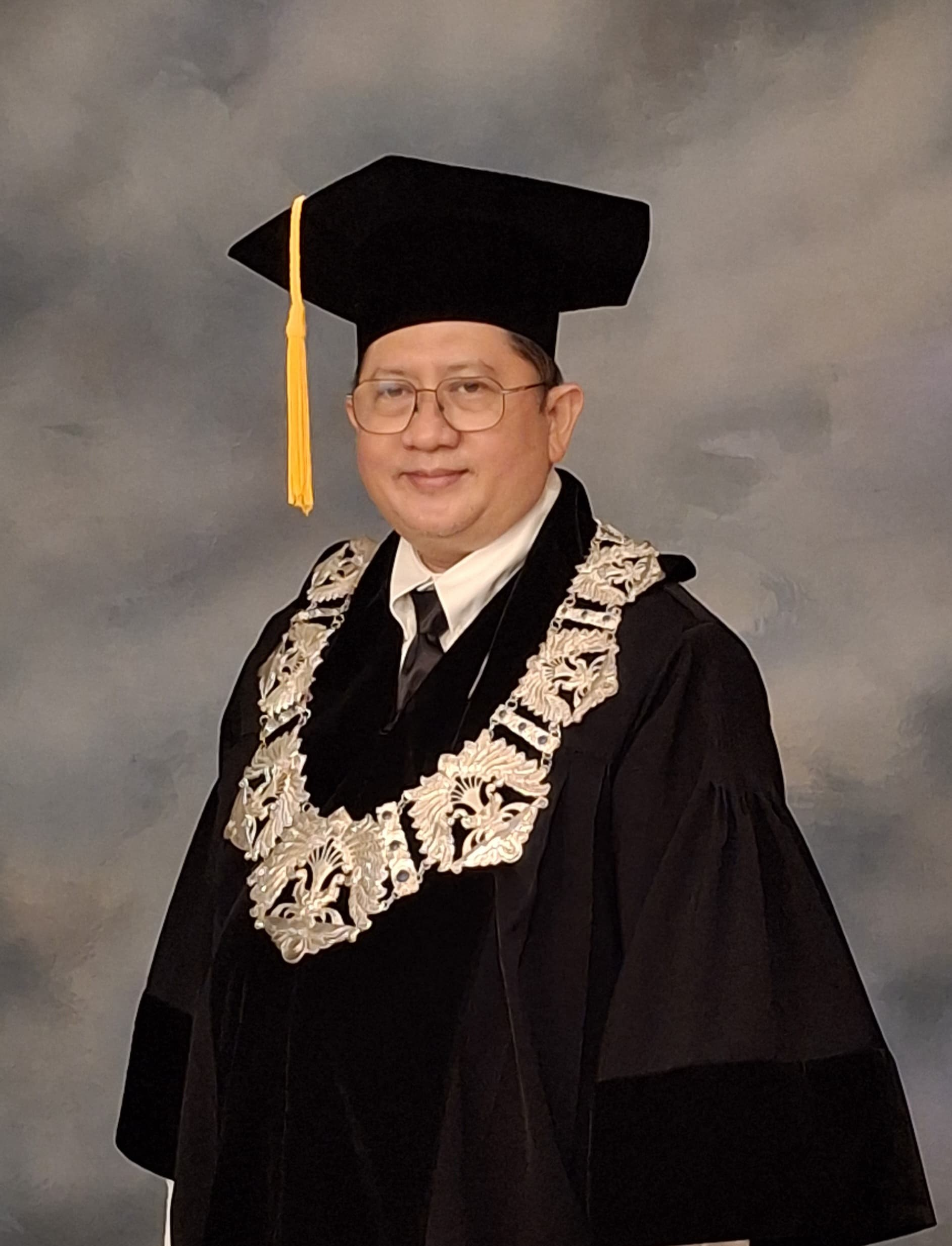
Kemas Ridwan Kurniawan as Full Professor of architecture at the University of Indonesia

Kemas Ridwan Kurniawan (born 28 January 1971) is an Indonesian architecture historian and a full professor of architecture at the University of Indonesia (UI). He is the current dean of UI's engineering faculty, serving since 31 January 2025. Previously, Kemas served as the chair of UI's architecture department from 2007 until 2013 and chairman of Jakarta Regional Research Council from 2019 to 2022.

== Early life and education ==
Kemas was born on 28 January 1971 in a hospital owned by the Bangka Tin Mining Company in Muntok from a Sumatran father and a Bangkanese mother. Kemas's father worked as a staff at a tin smelting company in Muntok before moving to work at the tin mining factory's central office in Jakarta. Kemas traced his ancestral roots to the Chinese Muslims people who lived in the Anambas Islands, which was then part of the Johor Sultanate, in the 18th century. These people migrated to Muntok and assimilated with other ethnic groups in the islands.

As a child, Kemas lived in the Peltim housing complex, which was outside the boundaries of the old Muntok town. Later in his life, he reflected the buildings at his housing complex as physically contrasted to the old Muntok town.

After completing high school, his parents recommended him to study medicine at the University of Indonesia. He opposed his parents' choice and picked architecture instead. He started his study at the university in August 1989. As an architecture student, Kemas and his class visited West Sumbawa in 1991 and Bima in 1992 to study vernacular architecture. Kemas graduated from the university in January 1995.

== Career ==
Kemas began working at an architectural firm in 1995, working on house and office designs. His first standalone architecture design was for the Ad-Dhuha orphanage in Pangkalpinang in 1996, which he made without any financial compensation. He also worked as an assistant professor at his almamater, assisting professor Siti Utamini in the studio designing class and Budi Sukada in architecture history class.

Kemas joined the Union of Indonesian Architects in 1997. On that same year, Siti Utamini offered him a full-time career as a lecturer. Kemas then left his architectural firm and became a full-time lecturer in the department. By department chair Gunawan Tjahjono, Kemas was appointed as his assistant for student affairs in 1997, and assistant for education in 1998. In 1999, Kemas conducted research on the Jengki style with research grant from the University of Indonesia and was in charge of organizing the first International Seminar on Vernacular Settlements. The seminar, which implemented a call for papers system, was the first of its kind for architecture departments in Indonesia.

The department received a Quality of Education Development grant from the World Bank, and Kemas was given the opportunity to continue his postgraduate studies in architecture. Based on the recommendation of Budi Sukada, Kemas picked The Bartlett Faculty of the Built Environment in the University College London for his postgraduate studies. After receiving his doctorate from the university in 2005, Kemas began teaching architecture history and architecture design. Two years later, in 2007, Kemas was entrusted to chair the architecture department. He served for two three-year terms until 2013.

During his tenure, the department established three new majors: undergraduate in interior architecture in 2007, Doctor of Architecture in 2008, and architecture professional education in 2009. The department also assisted architecture department in state universities in Indonesia who had a surplus of senior lecturers that were unable to continue their postgraduate studies. In 2010, Kemas was elected as the chairman of the union of architecture departments in Indonesia and served until 2013.

At the end of his tenure as department chair, on 1 April 2014 Kemas was appointed as a full professor in architecture, making him the youngest architecture professor in the university at that time. His inaugural speech as professor on 8 October 2014 discussed about the paradox on post-Suharto architecture in Indonesia. After his appointment as professor, Kemas became an advisor to the Jakarta government and Depok city government on heritage and government buildings. He also conducted research on architecture with universities abroad, such as the University of Florida and the Cardiff University.

On 5 March 2019, Kemas was installed as a member of the Jakarta Regional Research Council, an agency under the governor of Jakarta responsible for assisting the governor of Jakarta in resolving problem in Jakarta based on research approaches. Kemas was elected as the council's secretary exactly a week later, and several months later he became the council's chairman, replacing Dadang Solihin who was appointed as the deputy governor of Jakarta. During his tenure, the council assisted the Jakarta government in handling the COVID-19 pandemic by providing assessment on projects, such as the Grha Sehat Mandiri COVID mitigation center in Pademangan.

In 2024, Kemas ran as a candidate for the rector of the University of Indonesia. In his speech, Kemas pledged to develop UI's international achievements and ranking as well as diversify its source of income. He, however, failed to pass the final selection process.

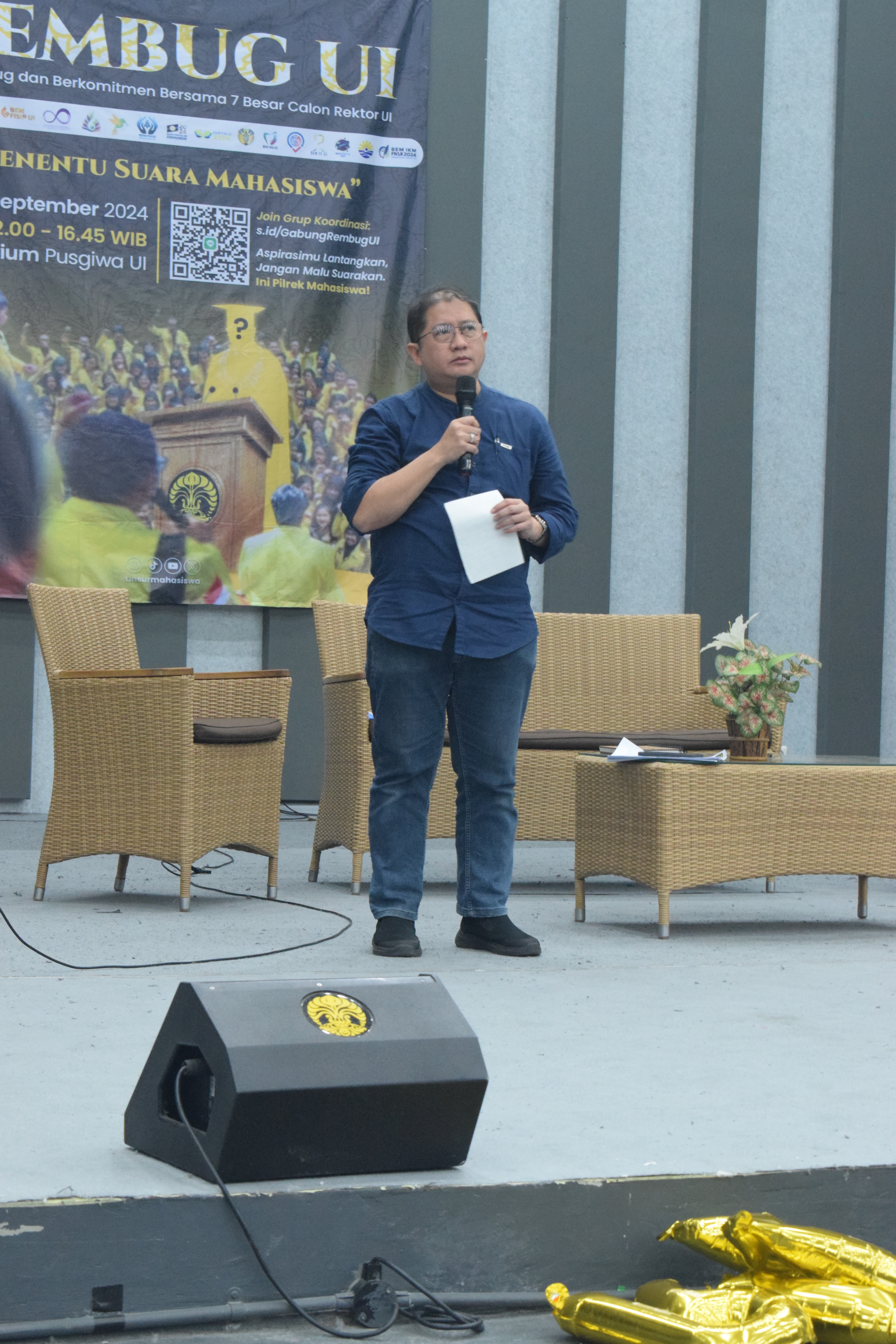
Kemas speaking at a student event in 2024.

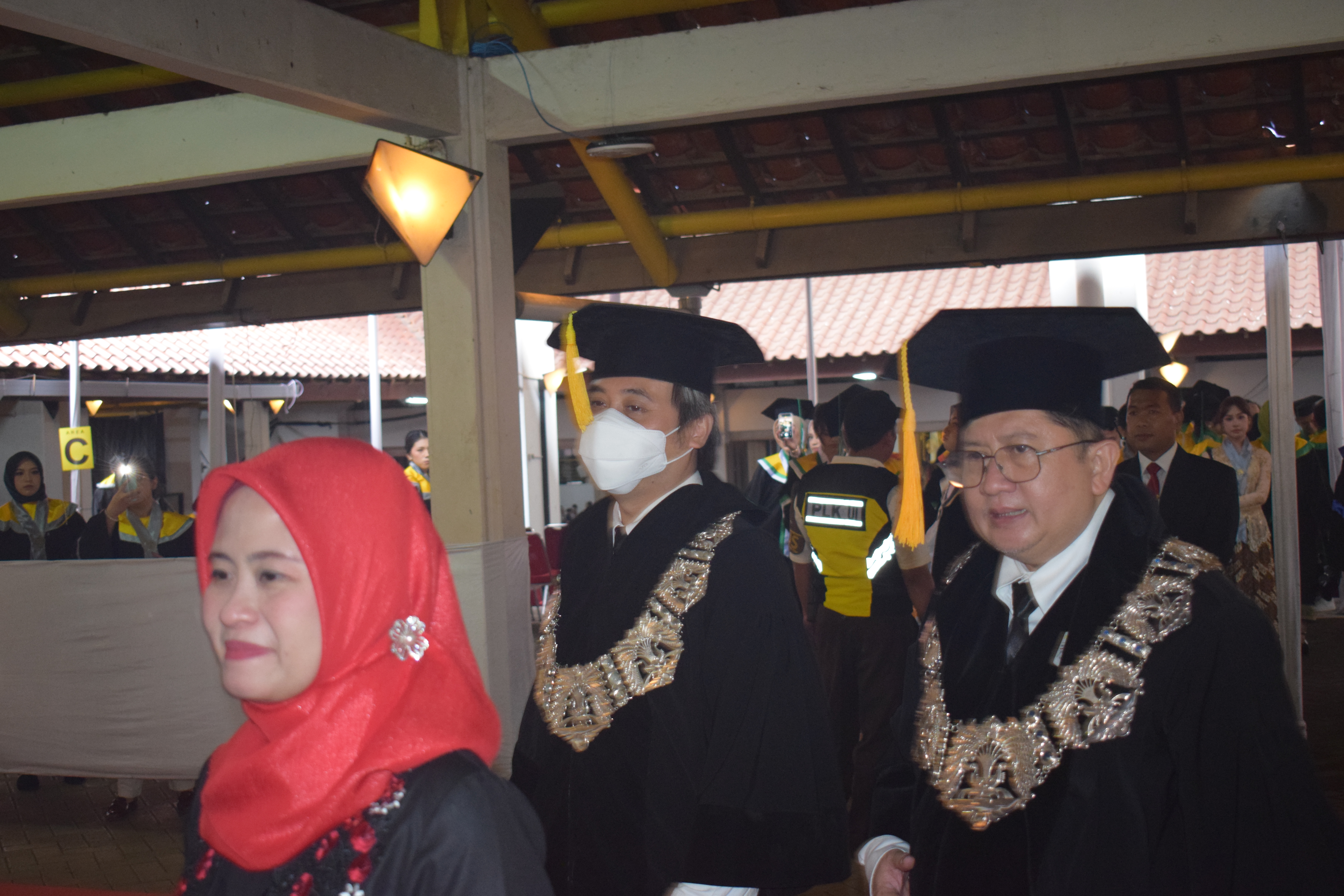
Kemas Ridwan Kurniawan (right) with dean of the economics faculty Teguh Dartanto at a graduation day ceremony in 2025.

On 22 January 2025, Kemas was announced as the dean of the engineering faculty of the University of Indonesia by rector—and predecessor—Heri Hermansyah after passing a series of assessments. He was installed for the position eight days later.

== Bibliography ==
- Kurniawan, Kemas Ridwan (2022-11-11), "Kolaborasi Keilmuan dalam Pelestarian Warisan Pusaka: Sejarah Arsitektur, Poskolonialitas, dan Keberlanjutan Lingkung-Bangun di Indonesia", in Zulkifli, Fitri Yuli; Mart, Terry; Nugroho, Yulianto Sulistyo (eds.), Meretas Batas Ilmu, Perjalanan Intelektual Guru Besar Sains Teknologi jilid 1, UI Press, ISBN 978-623-333-303-0
