= Abdul Haris =

Indonesian academic administrator

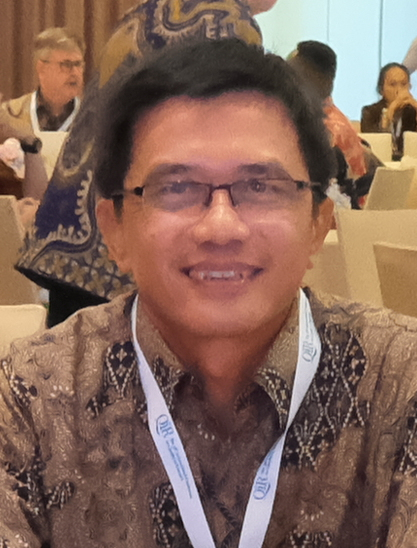

Deputy for Empowerment of Village Communities, Underdeveloped Areas, and Certain Regions
- Incumbent
- Assumed office 12 December 2024
- Minister: Muhaimin Iskandar
- Preceded by: office established

Director General for Higher Education (Note: As Director General for Higher Education, Research, and Technology until 20 October 2024)
- In office 15 March 2024 – 12 December 2024
- Minister: Nadiem Makarim
- Preceded by: Nizam
- Succeeded by: Khairul Munadi

Deputy Rector for Academic and Student Affairs of the University of Indonesia
- In office 21 October 2020 – 15 March 2024
- Preceded by: Rosari Saleh
- Succeeded by: Dedi Priadi (acting); Mahmud Sudibandriyo

Deputy Rector for Research and Innovation of the University of Indonesia
- In office 16 December 2019 – 21 October 2020
- Preceded by: Dedi Priadi
- Succeeded by: Nurtami Soedarsono

Dean of the Faculty of Math and Natural Sciences of the University of Indonesia
- In office 8 January 2014 – 16 December 2019
- Preceded by: Adi Basukriadi
- Succeeded by: Rokhmatuloh (acting); Dede Djuhana

Personal details
- Born: September 21, 1970 (age 56) Pemalang, Central Java, Indonesia
- Education: University of Indonesia (Drs, M.Si., Prof.); Kiel University (Dr. rer. nat.)

Abdul Haris (born 21 September 1970) is an academic and university administrator from the University of Indonesia (UI). He is currently a full professor in geophysics at the university since 2019, and the Deputy for Empowerment of Village Communities, Underdeveloped Areas, and Certain Regions in the Coordinating Ministry for Social Empowerment since 12 December 2024.

== Early life and education ==
Abdul Haris was born on 21 September 1970 in Pemalang, Central Java, as the oldest child of six. His parents worked as a farmer. Upon completing high school in 1988, Abdul Haris studied physics at the University of Indonesia, and graduated in 1992. He received his master's degree in physics from the same university in 1995.

Abdul began his doctoral study in geophysics at the Kiel University in 1999. He completed it in 2002 with a doctoral thesis titled Amplitude Preserving Pre-stack Depth Migration and Its Application to Imaging of BSR in Marine Multi-channel Seismic Reflection Data.

== Academic career ==
Abdul Haris began his career as a research assistant upon completing his master's degree in UI. He then worked as a seismic consultant for ARCO in Western New Guinea before starting his doctorate program in Germany. He then returned to UI in 2003 and become the secretary of the postgraduate major in the physics department.

Abdul's academic career in UI slowly rise. He became the manager for research and community service in 2004 and faculty secretary in 2008. In 2009, Abdul was elected as the vice president for certification affairs of the Indonesian Geophysical Society (HAGI). Throughout his career in the faculty, Abdul continued to give lecture on geophysics and supervise undergraduate and graduate geophysics students.

=== Deanship ===
Abdul Haris was appointed as UI's dean of math and natural sciences on 7 January 2014. He defeated Sumi Hudiyono PWS and Emil Budianto from the chemistry department and Gatot Fatwanto H. from the math department. Abdul Haris was installed the next day. He was reappointed for the position in 2017 as the sole candidate. During his tenure, the faculty established cooperation with the University of Putra Malaysia. Abdul also oversaw the construction of the faculty's multidiscipline building, funded by the state oil company Pertamina, and received a 7-billion-rupiah grant from the Sinar Mas Company. The faculty also struck a deal with Schlumberger and several other natural resource company for a 50-billion-rupiah grant, which was used to fund oil and gas exploration research. In terms of academic productivity, Abdul managed to increase the academic productivity of the faculty, becoming the second-largest producer of publications at UI and a 117% increase in the number of professors.

Abdul Haris was appointed as a full professor in geophysics 31 July 2019. On his inaugural speech, titled Challenges of Seismic Exploration Experts in the Search for Oil and Gas Sources: A New Paradigm in Oil and Gas Exploration, Abdul highlighted the decline of Indonesia's oil production and a need for new technologies and innovative approaches in oil and gas exploration to boost production. Abdul emphasized the exploration of shale hydrocarbons and urged the consideration of secondary porosity and basement rocks as potential reservoirs.

=== Rector candidacy ===
After a year into his second term as dean, Abdul Haris ran for the position of UI's rector. Abdul managed to pass the administrative selection process. He faced economics and business dean Ari Kuncoro and professor of obstetry Budi Wiweko. The final choice for the post of rector was made through an election, in which 16 of the 17 members of the university's board of trustees were eligible to vote (Incumbent rector Muhammad Anis was ineligible to vote). The Minister of Research and Higher Studies, which was a member of the board of trustees, has a supervote equivalent to eight normal votes. The minister, along with eight of the university's board of trustees, voted for Ari Kuncoro, while seven members voted for Abdul Haris.

=== Deputy rector ===
Shortly after Ari Kuncoro's inauguration as rector, on 16 December 2019 he appointed Abdul Haris as the third deputy rector, responsible for handling research and innovation. During this period, Abdul became the member of the university's statute amendment team. The amendment later become a point of controversy, as the amendment removed the ban on rector and deputy rector to hold positions in state-owned enterprises.

On 21 October 2020, Rosari Saleh, UI's first deputy rector responsible for academic and student affairs, was removed from her position due to disagreements over university management and performance expectations. Abdul Haris was appointed to fill in the vacancy. As the first deputy rector, Abdul visited several top universities in Australia to develop double degree programs.

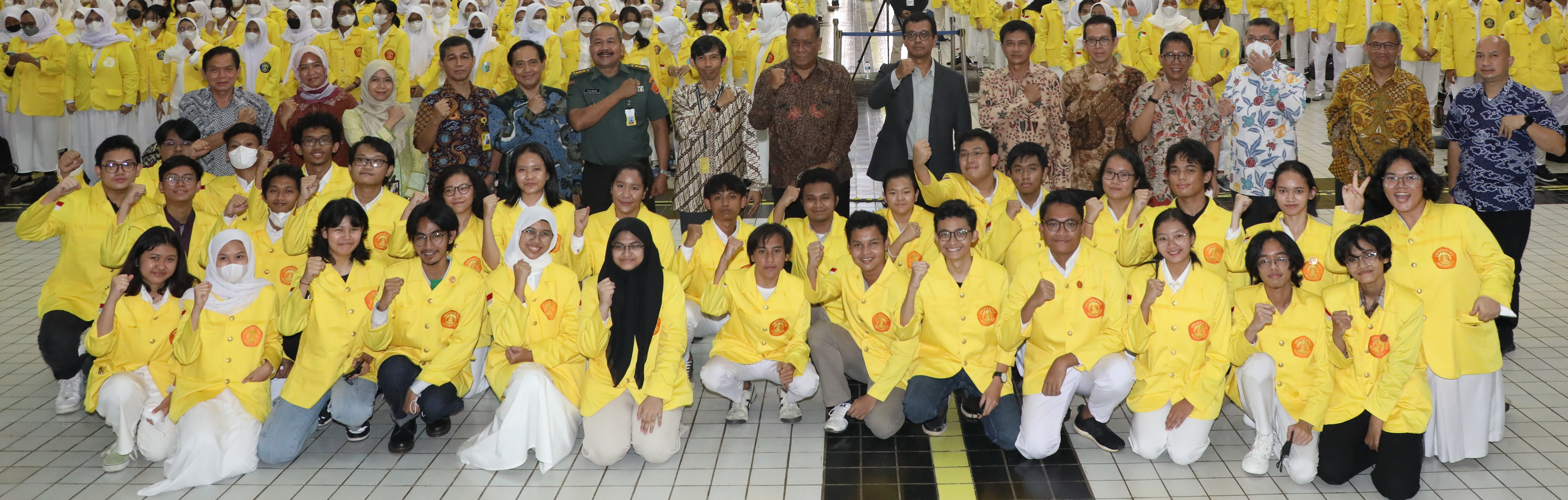
Abdul (standing, sixth from left) with UI officials and international relations freshmen at the opening of the 2022 UI orientation program.

== Bureaucratic career ==
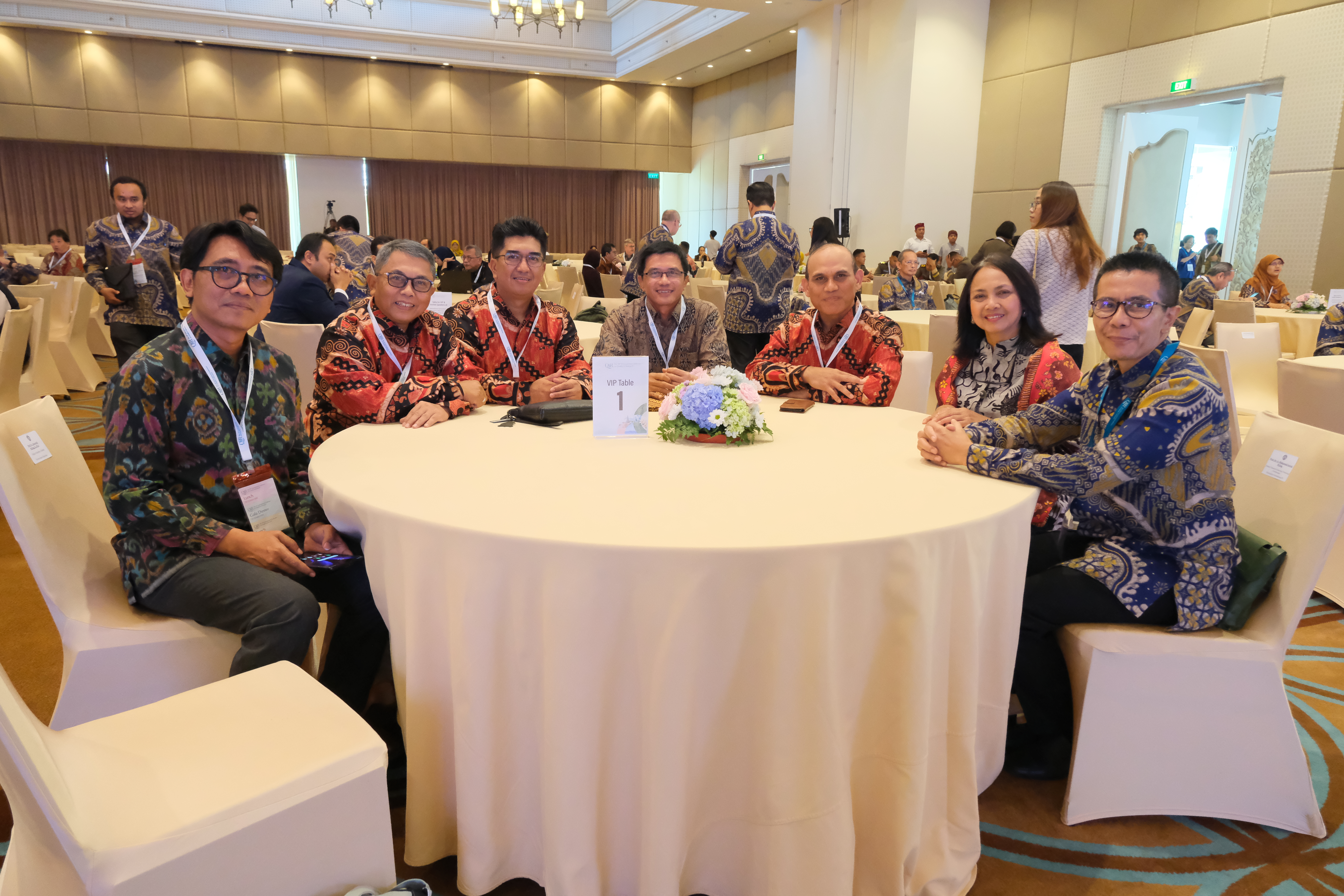
Abdul (third from right) with officials from the University of Indonesia and the Defence University.

In December 2023, Abdul was nominated as a candidate for the Director General of Higher Education, Research, and Technology in an open selection process by the Ministry of Education, Culture, Research, and Technology. Abdul received the highest score in the final competency test for the position. Abdul was installed as director general on 15 March 2024, replacing Nizam, who had held the position in an acting capacity for several years. On his inaugural speech, minister Nadiem Makarim instructed Abdul Haris to continue the implementation of the Merdeka Belajar Kampus Merdeka (MBKM) policy and achieve the eight key performance indicators for Indonesian universities. The directorate general is also expected to conduct a revitalization program for state universities to improve their quality and accelerate their transformation into Public Service Agencies (BLU) and Legal Entities (BH).

Shortly after his appointment, state universities all over Indonesia announced an increase in tuitions for freshmen, which sparked public outcry and student protests against the ministry and the directorate general. The new scheme resulted in freshmen from state universities all over the country withdrawing, as they struggled to pay their new tuition. In response to the protests, Abdul Haris and Nadiem Makarim were summoned to a hearing by the House of Representatives. Abdul stated that the protests was a result of a misconception and that the new tuition only applied to new students. Abdul also stated that students who were being burdened by the new scheme could file a review for their tuition placement. The new policy was fully reversed following a meeting with President Joko Widodo.

On 12 December 2024, Abdul was appointed as the Deputy for Empowerment of Village Communities, Underdeveloped Areas, and Certain Regions in the Coordinating Ministry for Social Empowerment. He had held the position in an acting capacity for several months before being appointed as a definitive officeholder. According to the Ministry of Higher Education, Science, and Technology's chief household staff, Abdul was dismissed after receiving an inappropriate treatment from minister Satryo Brodjonegoro, who replaced Nadiem Makarim in October 2024. During his tenure, on 22 April 2025, Abdul was elected as a member of the board of trustees of the University of North Sumatra.

In June 2025, following the liquefaction disaster at the Mendala village in Brebes Regency, Abdul was sent by Minister Muhaimin Iskandar to visit the site to coordinate multi-agency disaster response efforts and provide aid and compensation to the affected residents.
