= Ari Kuncoro =

Former Rector of the University of Indonesia

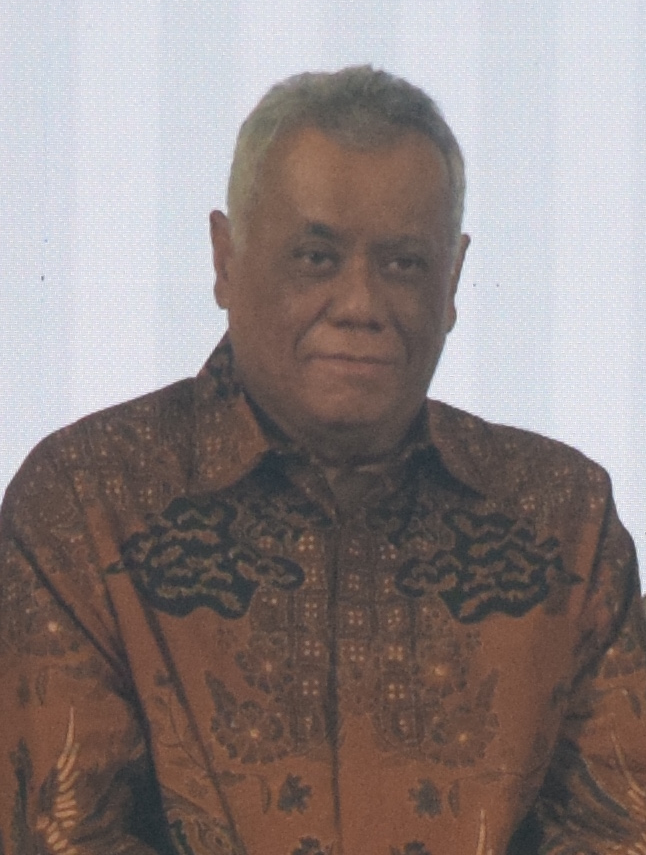

Rector of the University of Indonesia
- In office 4 December 2019 – 4 December 2024
- Preceded by: Muhammad Anis
- Succeeded by: Heri Hermansyah

Personal details
- Born: January 28, 1962 (age 64) Jakarta, Indonesia
- Spouse: Lana Soelistianingsih
- Education: University of Indonesia (S.E.); University of Minnesota (MA); Brown University (Ph.D.)
- Occupation: Banker, economist, and college administrator

Academic background
- Thesis: Prospect of Deficit Financing in Indonesia: A Simulation Study Using Macro Econometric Model (1986)

Academic work
- Discipline: Economy
- Institutions: University of Indonesia

Ari Kuncoro (born 28 January 1962) is an Indonesian banker, economist, author and university administrator, and the 15th rector of the University of Indonesia from 2019 to 2024. He took office on 4 December 2019, succeeding Muhammad Anis. Before becoming the rector of the University of Indonesia (UI), Ari taught at the Faculty of Economics and Business, becoming the faculty's dean from 2013 until 2019. Ari also held the office of chief commissioner of the Bank Negara Indonesia since 2017 and continued to hold the office after he was elected rector. Ari ended his term as chief commissioner in February 2020 and assumed the office of deputy chief commissioner of the Bank Rakyat Indonesia (BRI) in the same year. His new post sparked protests from the university's internal, who demanded he resign from his position in BRI as it violated the university statute. In response to this, the government removed the limitations from the university statute in a controversial amendment, but Ari later resigned from his position in BRI in July 2021.

== Early life and education ==
Ari was born on 28 January 1962 in Jakarta. Ari studied at the Faculty of Economics (now renamed to the Faculty of Economics and Business) of the University of Indonesia and graduated with a bachelor's degree in economics in 1986, with a thesis titled "Prospect of Deficit Financing in Indonesia: A Simulation Study Using Macro Econometric Model". He then continued his post-graduate studies at the University of Minnesota, focusing on development studies. He earned a Master of Arts degree from the university in 1990 and later obtained a Ph.D. degree from Brown University in 1994.

== Academic career ==
=== In the Faculty of Economics ===
Upon obtaining his doctorate from Brown University, Ari returned to Indonesia and joined the Faculty of Economics of the University of Indonesia as a researcher at the Institute of Economic and Community Research, the faculty's think tank. He later became the faculty's secretary in 1996 and the faculty's assistant dean for academic affairs in 1998. He was later promoted to the post of vice-dean, the second highest office in the faculty.

=== Dean of the Faculty of Economics and Business ===
On 9 December 2013 Ari was selected as the Dean of the Faculty of Economics and Business of the university by the acting rector of the university, Muhammad Anis.

== Rector of the University of Indonesia ==
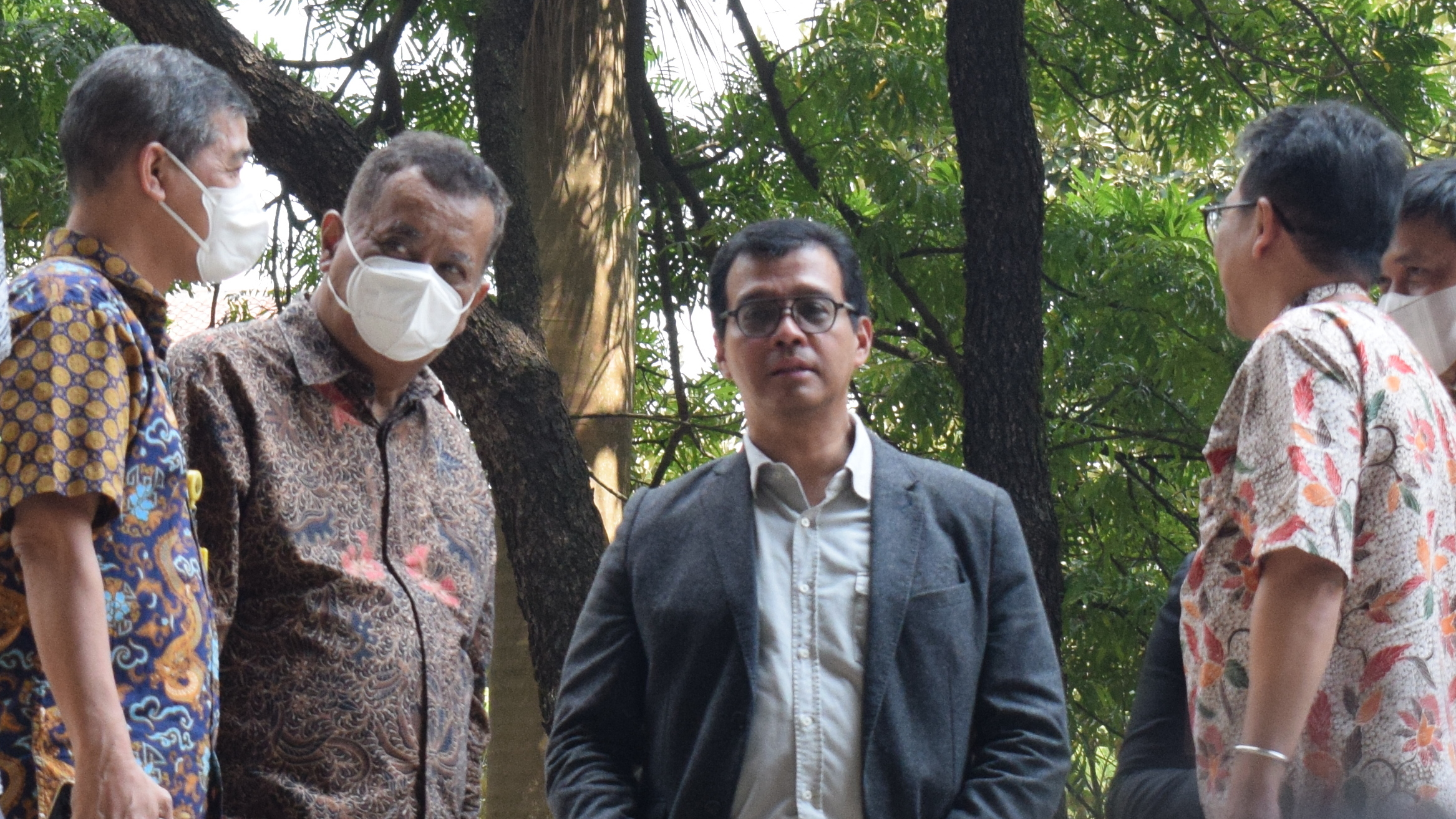
Ari Kuncoro (second from left) with the Governor of the National Resilience Institute, Andi Widjajanto (middle).

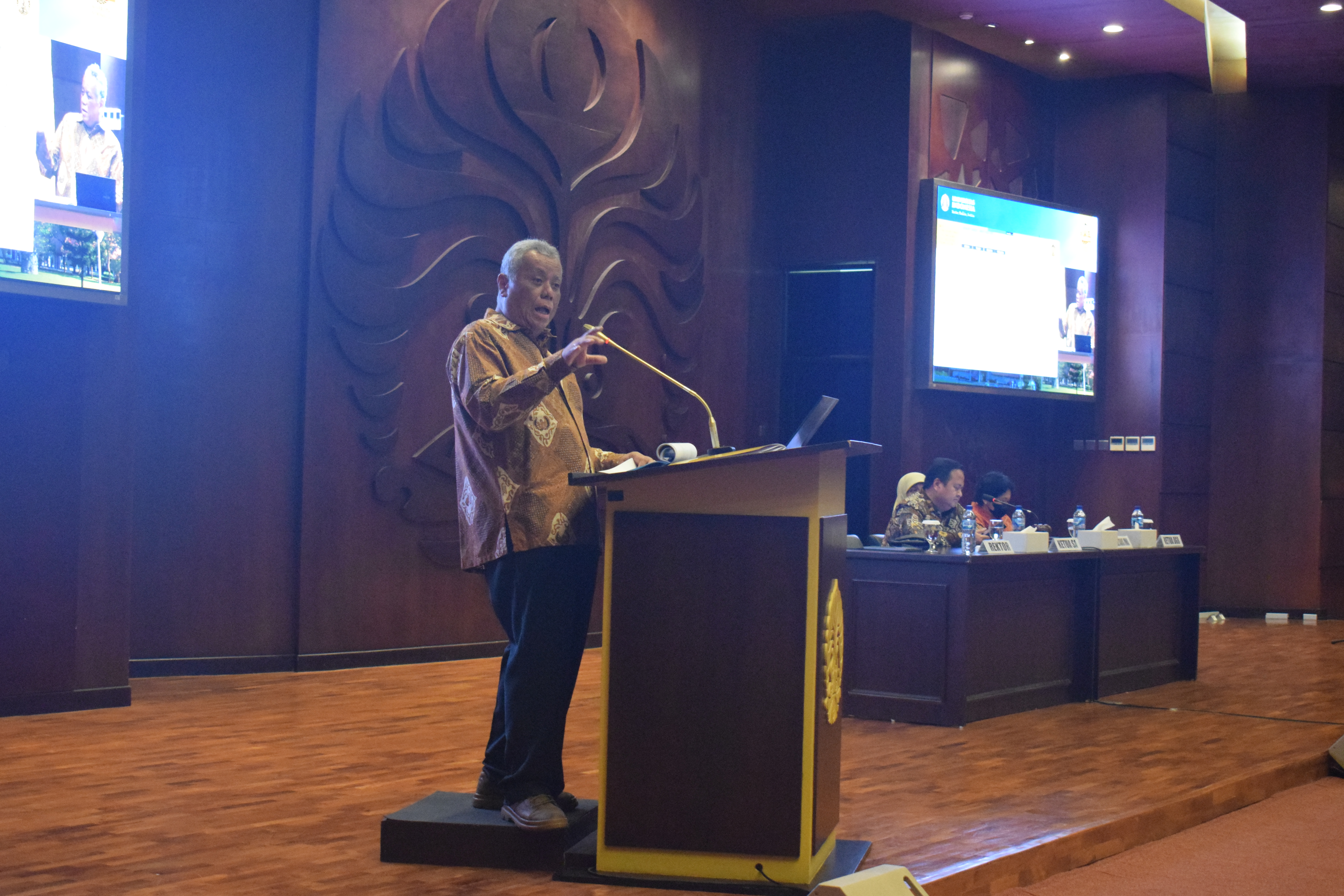
Ari Kuncoro delivering his yearly report as rector in 2024.

=== Election ===
Ari, along with several other academic figures, registered themselves as a candidate for the rector of the University of Indonesia in August 2019. Ari was announced eligible for the selection and he successfully passed several selection processes held by the university throughout September 2019. On 19 September 2019, the selection committee announced the three main candidates for the post: Ari from the Faculty of Economics and Business, Abdul Haris from the Faculty of Mathematics and Natural Sciences, and Budi Wiweko from the Faculty of Medicine.

The final choice for the post of rector was made through an election, in which all 16 members of the university's board of trustees — except the outgoing rector — were eligible to vote. The Minister of Research and Higher Studies, which held a seat on the board, has a share of 8 votes. Ari won the final election with 16 votes, defeating Abdul Haris who obtained 7 votes, and Budi Wiweko who obtained none. Ari was inaugurated as the university's rector by Saleh Husin, the chairman of the university's board of trustees, on 4 December 2019.

=== COVID-19 ===
Several months after Ari became rector, the first case of COVID-19 was found in Indonesia. On 13 March 2020, Ari announced that starting from 18 March, the university would implement remote classes and instructed all on-site activities such as experiments and community services to be suspended. He also issued travel restrictions on students and lecturers, including international program students, as well as instructing students who inhabited the university's dormitory to return home. Remote studies continued after the start of a new semester in September 2020. Events traditionally held at the beginning of the new semester, such as the graduation ceremony and welcoming ceremony for new students, were instead held remotely.

During the pandemic, Ari stated that the University of Indonesia conducted various research regarding COVID-19 to boost the domestic production of health equipment and medicines. Students and lecturers from UI took part in the country's COVID-19 task force, and UI provided its dormitory to the regional government as a quarantine site for COVID-19 patients. The university developed its software to combat the spread of COVID-19 in the university, such as the COVID-19 distribution map which allows the government to map regions prone to new COVID-19 infection cases. Aside from software, the university also developed medical devices to treat COVID-19 patients, such as COVENT-20, a ventilator made by the university for the COVID-19 task force, and the Quick Disinfection Booth, which allows the disinfecting process to be done in less than 10 seconds.

In mid-2021, following a decrease in active COVID-19 cases, the Minister of Education, Culture, Research, and Higher Education Nadiem Makarim urged universities in provinces with low amount of active COVID-19 cases to start on-site studies. Despite this, the university refused to hold full on-site studies, preferring selective and blended learning, which combines remote learning with on-site studies. The university later announced limited offline learning for several faculties in early 2022 and continued to push for full on-site studies. Full on-site studies were finally held in the latter half of 2022 concerning health protocols. The graduation and welcoming ceremony, which was held remotely for the previous two years, was finally held on the campus site.

=== Dismissal of Rosari Saleh ===
Rosari Saleh, a professor from the Faculty of Math and Natural Sciences, was one of the candidates in the 2019 rector selection process. After he was defeated in the primary, Rosari supported Ari and became a member of his campaign team. Rosari was appointed as vice rector following Ari's ascension to the post of rector. Rosari was known for his harsh stance against Islam fundamentalists in the Faculty of Math and Natural Sciences and retained her stance after she was appointed vice-rector.

In October 2020, Ari Kuncoro dismissed Rosari from his post and replaced him with Abdul Haris. Rosari's dismissal prompted backlash from the university's internal.

=== Tenure Completion ===
Kuncoro's tenure as Rector of the University of Indonesia officially concluded on 4 December 2024, succeeded by Prof. Dr. Ir. Heri Hermansyah, S.T., M.Eng., IPU.

Academic offices
Preceded by Muhammad Anis	Rector of the University of Indonesia; 2019–2024	Succeeded by Heri Hermansyah
Incumbent
Preceded by Jossy P. Moeis	Dean of the Faculty of Economics and Business of the University of Indonesia; 2013–2019	Succeeded by Beta Yulianita Gitaharie
