= Audrey Stuckes =

English material scientist (1923–2006)

Audrey Stuckes CPhys FInstP
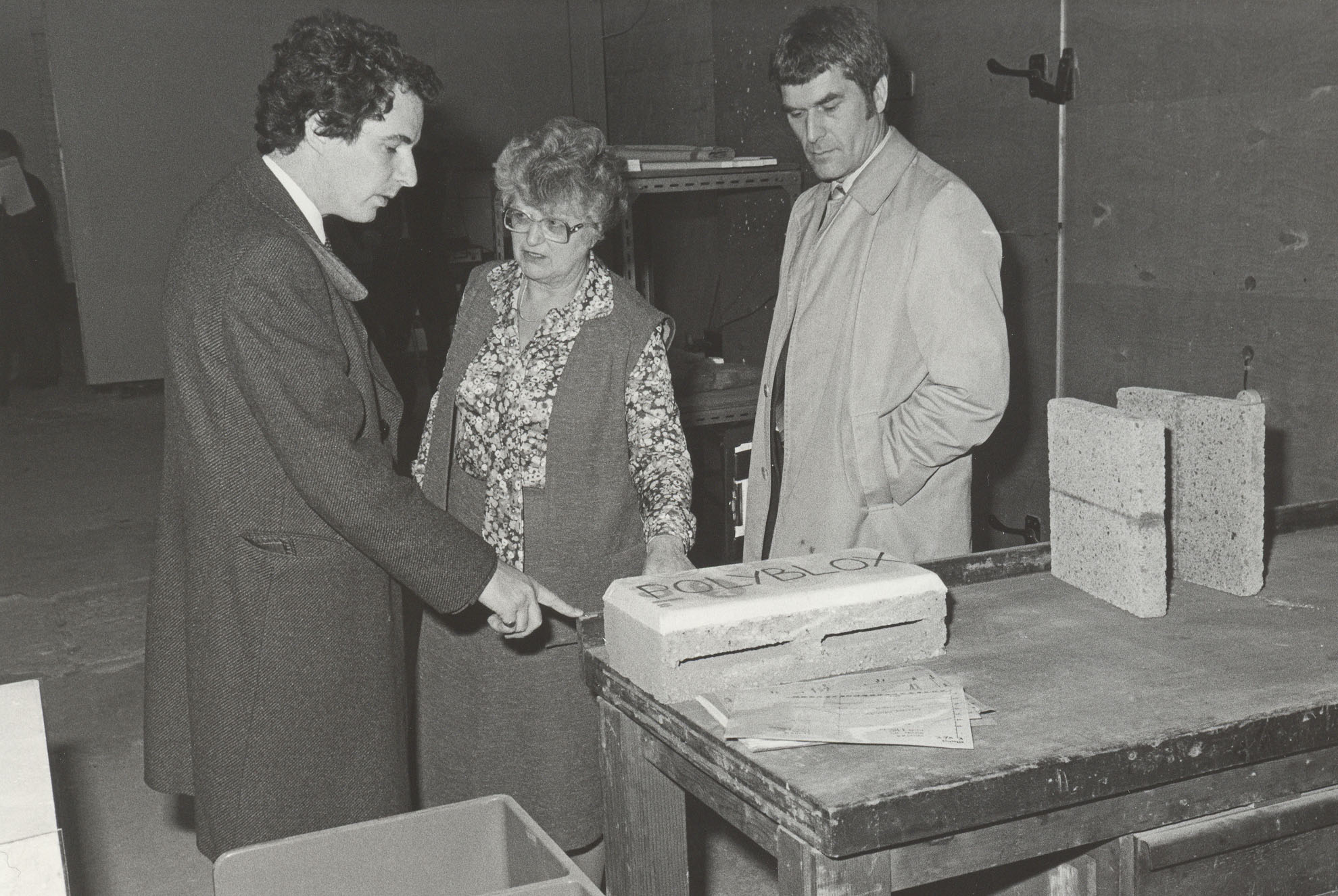
- Stuckes at the University of Salford in 1981
- Born: Audrey Doris Stuckes; 15 September 1923; Bristol, England
- Died: 26 September 2006 (aged 83); Urmston, Trafford, Greater Manchester, England
- Resting place: Altrincham Crematorium (ashes interred)
- Education: Colston's Girls' School, Montpelier, Bristol
- Alma mater: Newnham College, University of Cambridge (1950: MA (Cantab), 1969: PhD)
- Occupations: Research scientist in semiconductor physics; lecturer in thermal conductivity and resistivity
- Awards: Pfeiffer scholarship (1942)
- Scientific career
- Fields: Thermal and electrical conductivity
- Workplaces: Metropolitan-Vickers; University of Salford

Audrey Doris Jones CPhys FInstP (née Stuckes /stuːks/; 15 September 1923 – 26 September 2006) was an English material scientist and a senior lecturer in the department of applied acoustics at the University of Salford. She made important contributions to the theory of the Johnsen–Rahbek effect, the electrical and thermal conductivity of semiconductors, and the thermal resistance of building insulation. She was the only daughter of Frederick Stuckes, the general manager of a shipbroking firm, and was educated at Colston's Girls' School in Bristol. In 1942, she won a scholarship to study the Natural Science Tripos at Newnham College in the University of Cambridge.

Stuckes graduated in 1946 with a BA degree and joined Metropolitan-Vickers, Trafford, as a graduate trainee in the research department. From 1953, she published a series of papers on the thermal and electrical conductivity of semiconductors. She proved the existence of the Johnsen‑Rahbek effect and proposed an electric circuit model to explain the data. In December 1962, she was elected a Fellow of the Institute of Physics, and in the following year, she left Metropolitan-Vickers to work as a lecturer in the department of pure and applied physics at the Royal College of Advanced Technology, Salford, that became the University of Salford in 1967.

In 1975, Stuckes, together with John Edwin Parrott, published a well-received textbook that reviewed the theory and experimental data on thermal conductivity in solids and semiconductors. By 1979, she was a senior lecturer in the department of applied acoustics at Salford, and in the following year, she was in charge of the department's heat laboratory. The laboratory was supported by grants from, amongst others, the Science and Engineering Research Council and the Building Research Establishment. These grants funded studies to investigate the efficiency of insulating materials. She led a team to obtain experimental data that would allow builders to calculate a standard level of insulation. In 1982, she presented a television programme for the Open University that demonstrated the usefulness of these simple models of thermal conduction. She retired from the university in September 1988 and died after a long illness at a nursing home in Urmston, Trafford.

== Early life ==
Stuckes was born on 15 September 1923 at Bristol, England, the only daughter of Frederick Stephen Stuckes and Beatrice May, née Cogan. They had married on 8 January 1916 at St John the Baptist, Bedminster, Bristol. Her father worked for Bethell, Gwyn, and Company (Bethell Gwyn), at 11 Baldwin Street, Bristol, a shipbroking firm dealing mainly with Australasian trade. During World War I, he volunteered as a sergeant in the 1/4th Battalion of the City of Bristol Rifles, and on 27 June 1917, he was commissioned a second lieutenant in the Royal Warwickshire Regiment. However, later that year, he was severely injured in a shell barrage, and subsequently, he relinquished his commission on 22 June 1918.

After the war, Stuckes' father returned to Bethell Gwyn, and in March 1953, he was elected president of the Bristol Steamship Owners' Association. He had been elected a fellow of the Institute of Chartered Shipbrokers in 1945, and in August 1953, he was elected chair of the Bristol section of the institute. In September 1956, he retired from Bethell Gwyn after forty-eight years of service.

== Education ==
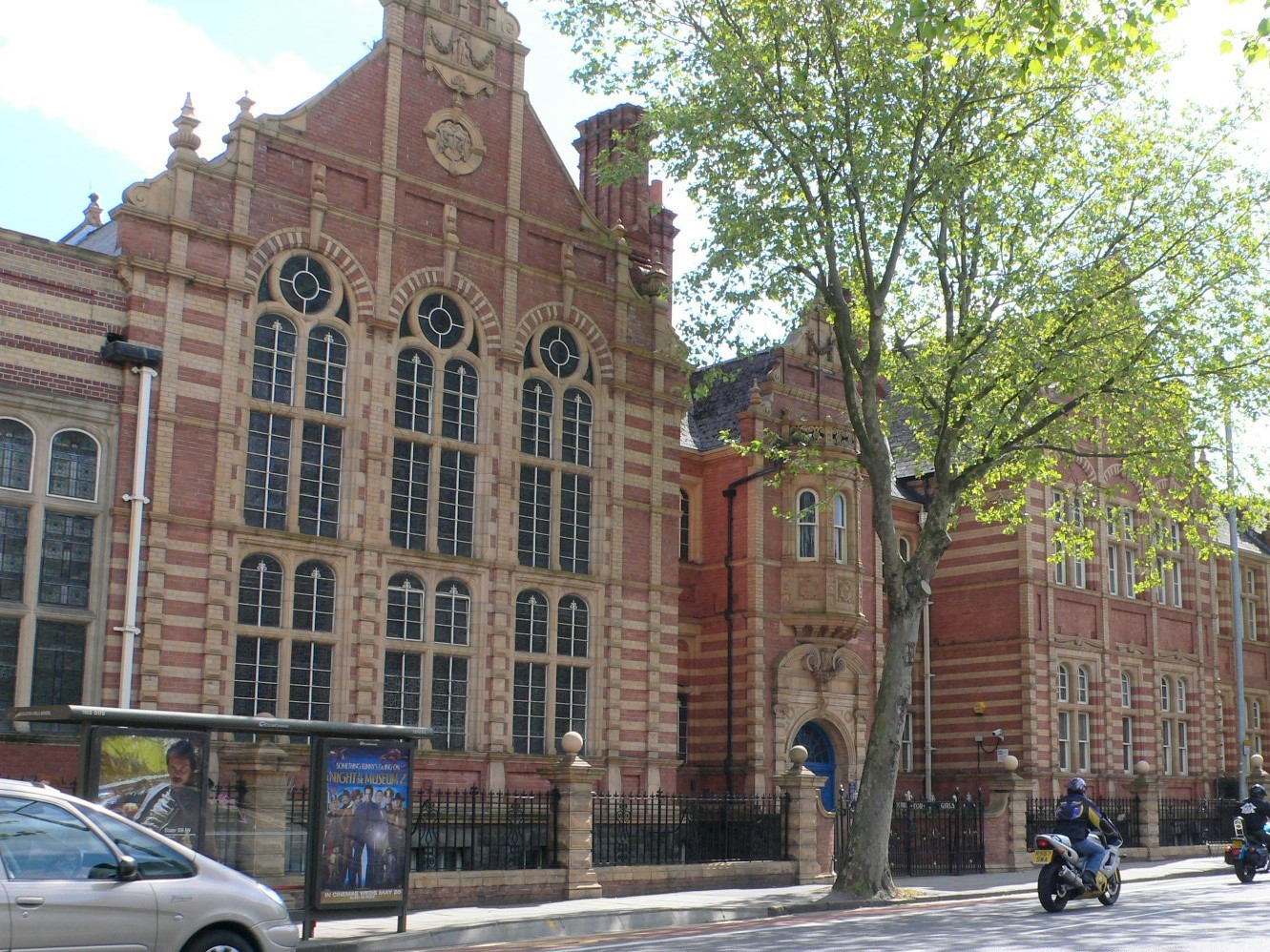
Colston's Girls' School, Bristol, where Stuckes was educated

Stuckes was first educated at Merrywood primary school in Knowle, Bristol. In June 1934, she gained a foundational boarding scholarship to Red Maids' School, Westbury-on-Trym. She went on to study at Colston's Girls' School, Montpelier, Bristol, where, in July 1942, she passed her Higher School Certificate in natural sciences with a distinction in chemistry. She was offered a Pfeiffer scholarship at Bedford College, University of London, and awarded a Gamble scholarship by the school of £50 a year (equivalent to £2,000 in 2025), that was tenable at the universities of Oxford, Cambridge, London, and at the Royal Free Hospital for Women. (Note: The scholarship was granted in years when the Catherine Winkworth scholarship was not available.)

However, instead of taking up the scholarship at Bedford, Stuckes entered Newnham College in the University of Cambridge, to study the Natural Science Tripos. In 1946, she graduated with a BA degree, and in the same year, she was elected a student member of the Physical Society of London. In 1950, she was elected an associate of the Institute of Physics and awarded an MA by Cambridge. In 1969, she returned to Cambridge to complete a PhD, and subsequently, she was elected to the senate of the university.

== Career ==
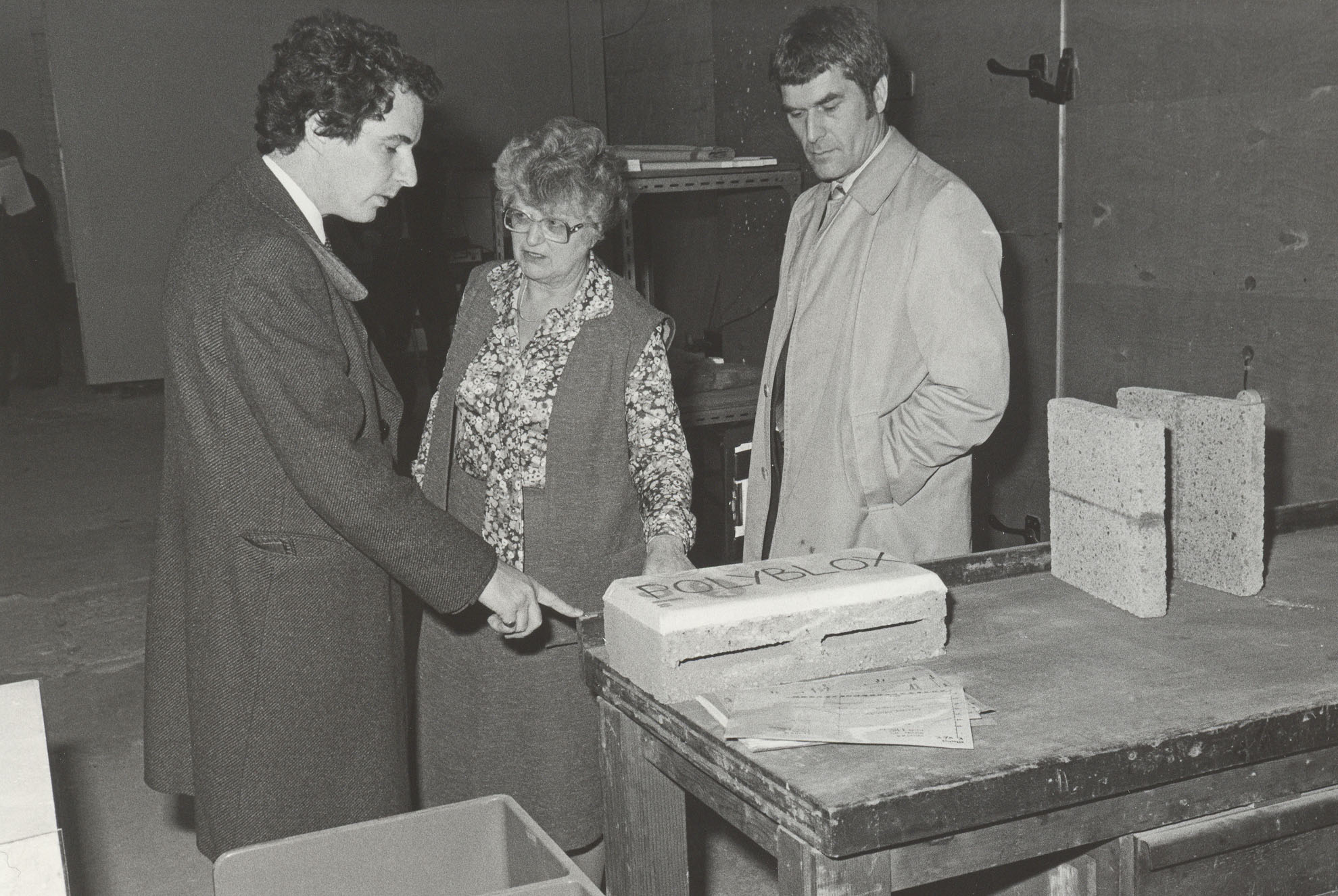
Stuckes meeting William Waldegrave (left) and vice-chancellor John Ashworth (right), at the University of Salford's heat laboratory in 1981

After leaving Cambridge, Stuckes joined Metropolitan-Vickers, Trafford, Greater Manchester, as a graduate trainee in the research department. Metropolitan-Vickers was a British heavy industrial firm, known for manufacturing electrical equipment and generators, street lighting, and electronics. The company had a relatively favourable attitude to placing graduate women in professional electrical engineering positions. For example, when Stuckes joined the company, Beryl Dent led the computation section and supervised the laboratory team that investigated the physical properties of semiconductors. Stuckes collaborated with Dent on Stuckes' first published paper on the heating effects that occur when a current is passed through a semiconductor. Dent suggested methods to solve the equations and computed the numerical integrations.

From 1953, Stuckes published a series of papers on the thermal and electrical conductivity of semiconductors. In one such paper, she investigated the electrostatic force between polished plates of a semiconductor and a metal when placed in contact and a voltage applied. The force is caused by the free charge that accumulates between the semiconductor and metal surfaces. This force, or attraction, is known as the Johnsen–Rahbek effect, and is proportional to the square of the applied voltage. Stuckes constructed a clutch that consisted of a plate of magnesium orthotitanate, a hard, ceramic semiconductor, that rubbed against a highly-polished steel plate. She found that abrasion at the contact surfaces caused the force to decrease as the number of operations increased and suggested the presence of an electron field emission effect at the contact boundary. She proved the existence of the effect, proposed an electric circuit model to explain the data, and noted that as the voltage increased, the area of field emission also increased, and consequently, this limited the field strength of the circuit.

On 4 December 1962, Stuckes was elected a Fellow of the Institute of Physics, and in the subsequent year, she left Metropolitan-Vickers to work as a lecturer in the department of pure and applied physics at the Royal College of Advanced Technology, Salford, that became the University of Salford in 1967. In 1975, Stuckes, together with John Edwin Parrott, published a textbook that reviewed the theory and experimental data on thermal conductivity in solids and semiconductors. Parrott was a scientist at the Aldermaston Court research laboratory of Associated Electrical Industries (the then holding company of Metropolitan-Vickers), and later, professor of physics at University of Wales, Cardiff. In 1956, he had obtained a PhD from the University of Reading on the thermal and thermoelectric properties of semiconductors. Paul Gustav Klemens, late professor of physics at the University of Connecticut, reviewed the book at the time of publication and stated that "[it] is most unique and valuable; the theoretical problem is very difficult, and nowhere is there such a good summary of the useful approximations and the salient results."

The builder is putting the material in an environment that is different from the one in which the conductivity has been measured.

— Stuckes, 7 February 1980 edition of the New Scientist

By 1979, Stuckes was a senior lecturer in the department of applied acoustics at Salford, and in 1980, she was in charge of the department's heat laboratory. The laboratory was supported by grants from the Polymer Engineering Directorate and the Building Subcommittee (she was a member of this committee in 1982) of the Science and Engineering Research Council, and the Building Research Establishment in the Department of the Environment. These grants funded a study to investigate how moisture in cavity walls affects the surrounding insulation. At the time, no one knew the exact efficiency of standard polymeric insulating materials as data was based on material in "dry" condition. Stuckes led a team to obtain experimental data that would allow builders to calculate a standard level of insulation. The study concluded that heat transfer in buildings can be modelled adequately by simple, one-dimensional, steady state models.

In 1981, Stuckes was interviewed by Alfred Bates about the most efficient way to heat and insulate homes. The interview was broadcast on 31 March 1981, as part of a BBC North West regional television documentary series entitled Towards Tomorrow. In the following year, she presented a television programme for the Open University that demonstrated the usefulness of simple models of thermal conduction. (Note: See One-dimensional steady state heat transfer in the external links section for a video of the Open University programme presented by Stuckes.) The programme was first broadcast on BBC One in the morning of 3 May 1982 and formed part of the Open University's unit on heat transfer. In the 1980s, she continued to publish research on the thermal properties of building materials. In one study with Anthony Simpson, (Note: Prior to 2025, Simpson was head of the thermal laboratory at Salford.) they found that the shape of air inclusions within vermiculite concrete affected the thermal conductivity of the concrete. This finding was explored further with British Petroleum and resulted in a joint patent being granted on a thermally insulating filler. By May 1986, she was awarded Chartered Physicist status by the Institute of Physics, and by September 1988, she had retired from her position at the university.

== Personal life and death ==
In retirement, Stuckes resided at 58 Carlton Road in Hale, Trafford. In October 1947, she had become engaged to Douglas Perrin Jones, the eldest son of William Henry Perrin Jones of Port Sunlight, Wirral. At the time of their engagement, Douglas was an electrical engineer in the research department at Metropolitan-Vickers. When they both worked there, he would assist in her research, including in 1953, an investigation into the heating effects that occur when a current is passed through a semiconductor. After their marriage at Bristol in 1949, she continued to use her maiden name in her academic life and scientific publications.

Douglas retired in 1984 after 46 years' service as a research engineer with the General Electric Company. He died in hospital on 15 July 1995, aged 75 years, and his funeral service was held on 21 July 1995 at Altrincham Crematorium, Dunham Massey. Stuckes died after a long illness on 26 September 2006, aged 83 years, at Faversham Nursing Home, Urmston, Trafford. Her funeral service was held at the same crematorium on 3 October 2006 and her ashes were later interred in the crematorium grounds.

== Academic conferences ==
The following table lists academic conferences where Stuckes was known to have organised the conference and/or read a paper.

Table of academic conferences
| Dates | Conference | Sponsor | Location | Notes | Ref. |
|---|---|---|---|---|---|
| 11–13 April 1956 | Meeting on semiconductors | Physical Society of London and British Thomson-Houston | British Thomson-Houston Research Laboratories, Rugby, Warwickshire, England | Reginald Chasmar and Stuckes presented their paper on the measurement of the thermal conductivity of semiconductors. | |
| 29 August – 2 September 1960 | International conference on semiconductor physics | UNESCO and the International Union of Pure and Applied Physics | Czech Academy of Sciences, Prague, Czech Republic | Reginald Chasmar, Eric Durham, and Stuckes presented their paper on the thermal and electrical properties of cadmium telluride and mercury telluride semiconductors. | |
| 10–12 July 1961 | Conference on thermoelectricity | Institute of Physics | University of Durham, Durham, England | Stuckes presented her paper on measuring the thermal conductivity of semiconductors at high temperatures. | |
| 7–10 April 1970 | Second conference on the thermophysical properties of solids at high temperatures | Solid-state physics sub-committee of the Institute of Physics, in collaboration with the British Ceramic Society and the Society of Chemical Industry | United Kingdom Atomic Energy Authority (now the headquarters of Sellafield Ltd), Risley, Warrington, England | Stuckes was the organising scientific secretary. The topic of the conference was the thermodynamics and transport properties of high-temperature materials. The proceedings were reported in two issues of the International Journal of High Temperatures and Refractories. | |

== Selected publications ==
=== Books ===
- Parrott, John Edwin; Stuckes, Audrey Doris (1975). Goldsmid, Hiroshi Julian (ed.). Thermal conductivity of solids. Applied Physics. London: Pion Limited. pp. 1–157. ISBN 978-0-85086-047-4. OCLC 1594038. "8th in the series on applied physics."

=== Patents ===
- EP patent 0065410, Simpson, Anthony & Stuckes, Audrey Doris, "Thermally insulating filler and compositions containing such a filler", issued 5 September 1984, assigned to The British Petroleum Company Plc.

=== Academic papers ===
==== Electrical and thermal conductivity of semiconductors ====
- Stuckes, Audrey Doris (July 1953). "Electro‑thermal behaviour of point contacts to semiconductors". Proceedings of the Physical Society. Section B. 66 (7). London: Physical Society of London: 570–587. Bibcode:1953PPSB...66..570S. doi:10.1088/0370-1301/66/7/306. ISSN 0370-1301. S2CID 137054255. "Communicated by Brian Andrew Graham Churcher. Paper received 9 January 1953, and in final form, 9 April 1953."
- Stuckes, Audrey Doris (March 1956). "Some theoretical and practical considerations of the Johnsen-Rahbek effect". Proceedings of the Institution of Electrical Engineers. Part B. Radio and Electronic Engineering. 103 (8). London: Institution of Electrical Engineers: 125–131. doi:10.1049/pi-b-1.1956.0128. ISSN 2054-0434. S2CID 110081101. Paper number 2007 M. "Paper first received 9 September 1955, and in revised form, 14 November 1955. Published later in the Metropolitan Vickers Gazette v. 27, no. 448 (November 1956). See also Johnsen–Rahbek effect"
- Stuckes, Audrey Doris; Chasmar, Reginald Philip (April 1956). "Measurement of the thermal conductivity of semiconductors". Report of the meeting on semiconductors. London: Physical Society of London. pp. 119–126. OCLC 2285213.
- Stuckes, Audrey Doris (November 1956). "Some theoretical and practical considerations of the Johnsen-Rahbek effect". Metropolitan Vickers Gazette. Research. 27 (448). Trafford: Metropolitan-Vickers: 350–357. OCLC 30212772. "First published in the Proceedings of the Institution of Electrical Engineers v. 103, no. 8 (March 1956)"
- Stuckes, Audrey Doris (July 1957). "Thermal conductivity of indium antimonide". Physical Review. II. 107 (2). New York: American Institute of Physics for the American Physical Society: 427–428. Bibcode:1957PhRv..107..427S. doi:10.1103/PhysRev.107.427. ISSN 0031-899X. S2CID 120070079.
- Stuckes, Audrey Doris (January 1960). "The thermal conductivity of germanium, silicon and indium arsenide from 40°C to 425°C". Philosophical Magazine. 8th. 5 (49). London: Taylor & Francis: 84–99. Bibcode:1960PMag....5...84S. doi:10.1080/14786436008241203. ISSN 0031-8086. S2CID 136639732. "Paper received 6 May 1953, and in revised form, 24 August 1959."
- Chasmar, Reginald Philip; Durham, Eric Walter; Stuckes, Audrey Doris (1961). "The thermal and electrical properties of cadmium and mercury tellurides". Proceedings of the International Conference on Semiconductor Physics, Prague, 1960. New York: Academic Press and the Publishing House of the Czechoslovak Academy of Sciences. pp. 1018–1022. OCLC 2479263.
- Stuckes, Audrey Doris (December 1961). "Measurement of the thermal conductivity of semiconductors at high temperatures". British Journal of Applied Physics. 12 (12). Bristol: IOP Publishing: 675–679. Bibcode:1961BJAP...12..675S. doi:10.1088/0508-3443/12/12/308. ISSN 0508-3443. S2CID 96054017. "Stuckes is stated as working in the research department at Associated Electrical Industries, Trafford Park, Manchester. The paper was presented to the conference on thermoelectricity at the University of Durham in July 1961."
- Stuckes, Audrey Doris; Chasmar, Reginald Philip (May 1964). "Electrical and thermal properties of alloys of indium arsenide and cadmium telluride". Journal of Physics and Chemistry of Solids. 25 (5). Oxford: Pergamon Press: 469–476. Bibcode:1964JPCS...25..469S. doi:10.1016/0022-3697(64)90119-2. ISSN 0022-3697.
- Stuckes, Audrey Doris; Farrell, G. (May 1964). "Electrical and thermal properties of alloys of cadmium telluride and cadmium selenide". Journal of Physics and Chemistry of Solids. 25 (5). Oxford: Pergamon Press: 477–482. Bibcode:1964JPCS...25..477S. doi:10.1016/0022-3697(64)90120-9. ISSN 0022-3697. S2CID 227353732. "Stuckes is stated as working at the Royal College of Advanced Technology, Salford. Paper received 14 June 1963, and in revised form, 12 November 1963."
- Stuckes, Audrey Doris (April 1965). "Progress in semiconductors". Memoirs and Proceedings. 108. Manchester Literary and Philosophical Society: 124–135. ISSN 0076-3721. OCLC 7726729. "The paper was presented at a meeting of the natural philosophy section of the society on 28 April 1965."
- Simpson, Anthony; Stuckes, Audrey Doris (September 1971). "The thermal conductivity of highly oriented pyrolytic boron nitride". Journal of Physics C: Solid State Physics. 4 (13). Bristol: IOP Publishing: 1710–1718. Bibcode:1971JPhC....4.1710S. doi:10.1088/0022-3719/4/13/021. ISSN 0022-3719. S2CID 122909670.
- Simpson, Anthony; Stuckes, Audrey Doris (March 1976). "The thermal conductivity of 'isotropic' and hot‑pressed boron nitride". Journal of Physics D: Applied Physics. 9 (4). Bristol: IOP Publishing: 621–630. Bibcode:1976JPhD....9..621S. doi:10.1088/0022-3727/9/4/013. ISSN 0022-3727. S2CID 121595478. "Paper received 16 July 1975, and in final form, 24 November 1975."

==== Thermal conductivity of building materials ====
- Stuckes, Audrey Doris (November 1984). "The thermal resistance of a cavity filled wall". Physics in Technology. 15 (6). Bristol: IOP Publishing: 315–320. Bibcode:1984PhTec..15..315S. doi:10.1088/0305-4624/15/6/305. ISSN 0305-4624. S2CID 111077953. "Includes a portrait photograph of Stuckes on page 315."
- Stuckes, Audrey Doris; Simpson, Anthony (May 1985). "The effect of moisture on the thermal conductivity of aerated concrete". Building Services Engineering Research and Technology. 6 (2). London: Chartered Institution of Building Services Engineers: 49–53. doi:10.1177/014362448500600201. ISSN 0143-6244. S2CID 110639218.
- Stuckes, Audrey Doris; Tinker, John Alan; Simpson, Anthony (February 1986). "The effect of moisture on the thermal conductivity of lightweight aggregate concrete". Building Services Engineering Research and Technology. 7 (1). London: Chartered Institution of Building Services Engineers: 27–32. doi:10.1177/014362448600700104. ISSN 0143-6244. S2CID 110353735.
- Simpson, Anthony; Stuckes, Audrey Doris (May 1986). "Thermal conductivity of porous materials: I. Theoretical treatment of conduction processes". Building Services Engineering Research and Technology. 7 (2). London: Chartered Institution of Building Services Engineers: 78–86. doi:10.1177/014362448600700204. ISSN 0143-6244. S2CID 110249462.
- Stuckes, Audrey Doris; Simpson, Anthony (May 1986). "Moisture factors and thermal conductivity of concrete". Building Services Engineering Research and Technology. 7 (2). London: Chartered Institution of Building Services Engineers: 73–74. doi:10.1177/014362448600700203. ISSN 0143-6244. S2CID 110231613.
- Simpson, Anthony; Stuckes, Audrey Doris (February 1987). "Thermal conductivity of vermiculite concrete: Effect of inclusion shape". Building Services Engineering Research and Technology. 8 (1). London: Chartered Institution of Building Services Engineers: 1–4. doi:10.1177/014362448700800101. ISSN 0143-6244. S2CID 108812412.
- Simpson, Anthony; Stuckes, Audrey Doris; Napora, Marek (November 1988). "Loft insulants: Effect of air speed on thermal performance" (PDF). Building Services Engineering Research and Technology. 9 (4). London: Chartered Institution of Building Services Engineers: 159–166. doi:10.1177/014362448800900403. ISSN 0143-6244. S2CID 108951327. Archived (PDF) from the original on 6 September 2020 – via Air Infiltration and Ventilation Centre. "Paper received 5 February 1988, and in final form, 20 April 1988."
- Simpson, Anthony; O'Connor, David Everard; Stuckes, Audrey Doris (November 1991). "Mineral fibre filled cavity wall: Hygrothermal properties" (PDF). Building Services Engineering Research and Technology. 12 (4). London: Chartered Institution of Building Services Engineers: 137–143. doi:10.1177/014362449101200403. ISSN 0143-6244. S2CID 111175077. Archived (PDF) from the original on 5 September 2020 – via Air Infiltration and Ventilation Centre. "The paper notes that Stuckes has now retired. Paper received 24 September 1990, and in final form, 19 May 1991."

== See also ==
- Trevor Cox
- Beryl May Dent
- Arthur Fleming
- Isabel Hardwich
- Robert Lomas
- Metropolitan-Vickers

== Bibliography ==
- Dent, Beryl May (1955). Careers: A memorandum on openings and trainings for girls and women (17th ed.). London: Women's Employment Federation. OCLC 30187377. British Library 013988952.
