= Starchitect =

Portmanteau used to describe a famous architect

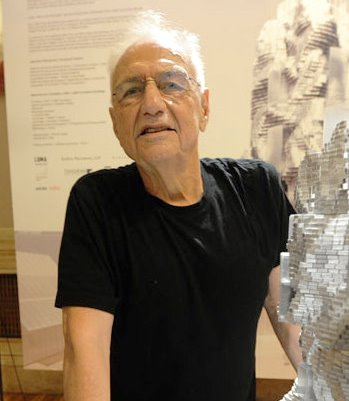
Frank Gehry, who was described as a starchitect

Starchitect is a portmanteau used to describe architects whose celebrity and critical acclaim have transformed them into stars of the architecture world and may even have given them some degree of fame among the general public. Celebrity status is generally associated with avant-gardist novelty. Real estate developers around the world have proven eager to sign up "top talent" (i.e., starchitects) in hopes of convincing reluctant municipalities to approve large developments, of obtaining financing or of increasing the value of their buildings. A key characteristic is that the starchitecture is almost always "iconic" and highly visible within the site or context.

== The Bilbao effect ==
Buildings are frequently regarded as profit opportunities, so creating "scarcity" or a certain degree of uniqueness gives further value to the investment. The balance between functionality and avant-gardism has influenced many property developers. For instance, architect-developer John Portman found that building skyscraper hotels with vast atriums—which he did in various U.S. cities during the 1980s—was more profitable than maximizing floor area.

However, it was the rise of postmodern architecture during the late 1970s and early 1980s that gave rise to the idea that star status in the architectural profession was about an avant-gardism linked to popular culture—which, it was argued by postmodern critics such as Charles Jencks, had been derided by the guardians of a modernist architecture. In response, Jencks argued for "double coding"; i.e., that postmodernism could be understood and enjoyed by the general public and yet command "critical approval". The star architects from that period often built little or their best-known works were "paper architecture"—unbuilt or even unbuildable schemes, yet known through frequent reproduction in architectural magazines, such as the work of Léon Krier, Michael Graves, Aldo Rossi, Robert A. M. Stern, Hans Hollein, and James Stirling. As postmodernism went into decline, its avant-gardist credentials suffered due to its associations with vernacular and traditionalism, and celebrity shifted back towards modernist avant-gardism.

But a high-tech strand of modernism persisted in parallel with a formally retrogressive post-modernism; one that often championed "progress" by celebrating, if not exposing, structure and systems engineering. Such technological virtuosity can be discovered during this time in the work of Norman Foster, Renzo Piano, and Richard Rogers, the latter two having designed the controversial Pompidou Centre (1977) in Paris, which opened to international acclaim. What this so‑called high-tech architecture showed was that an industrial aesthetic—an architecture characterized as much by urban grittiness as engineering efficiency—had popular appeal. This was also somewhat evident in so‑called deconstructionist architecture, such as the employment of chainlink fencing, raw plywood and other industrial materials in designs for residential and commercial architecture. Arguably the most notable practitioner along these lines, at least in the 1970s, was internationally renowned architect Frank Gehry, whose house in Santa Monica, California bore these characteristics.

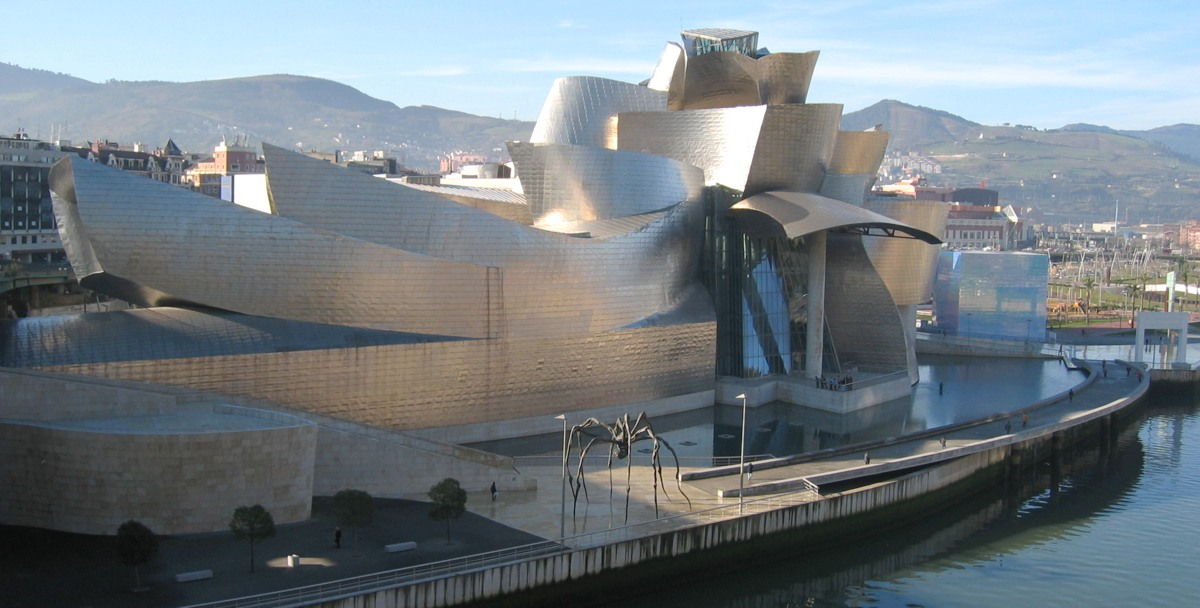
The Guggenheim Museum Bilbao by Frank Gehry, along the Nervión River, Bilbao

With urban generation from the turn of the twentieth century picking up, economists forecast that globalization and the powers of multinational corporations would shift the balance of power away from nation states towards individual cities, which would then compete with neighboring cities and cities elsewhere for the most lucrative modern industries, and which increasingly in major Western Europe and U.S. cities did not include manufacturing. Thus cities set about "reinventing themselves", giving precedence to the value given by culture. Municipalities and non-profit organizations hope the use of a starchitect will drive traffic and tourist income to their new facilities. With the popular and critical success of the Guggenheim Museum in Bilbao, Spain, by Frank Gehry, in which a rundown area of a city in economic decline brought in huge financial growth and prestige, the media started to talk about the so-called 'Bilbao effect'; a star architect designing a blue-chip, prestige building was thought to make all the difference in producing a landmark for the city. Similar examples are the Imperial War Museum North (2002), Greater Manchester, UK, by Daniel Libeskind, the Kiasma Museum of Contemporary Art, Helsinki, Finland, by Steven Holl, and the Seattle Central Library (2004), Washington state, United States, by OMA.

The origin of the phrase "wow factor architecture" is uncertain, but has been used extensively in business management in both the UK and United States to promote avant-gardist buildings within urban regeneration since the late 1990s. It has even taken on a more scientific aspect, with money made available in the UK to study the significance of the factor. In research carried out in Sussex University, UK, in 2000, interested parties were asked to consider the "effect on the mind and the senses" of new developments. In an attempt to produce a "delight rating" for a given building, architects, clients and the intended users of the building were encouraged to ask: "What do passers‑by think of the building?", "Does it provide a focal point for the community?" The Design Quality Indicator has been produced by the UK Construction Industry Council, so that bodies commissioning new buildings will be encouraged to consider whether the planned building has "the wow factor" in addition to more traditional concerns of function and cost.

The "wow factor" has also been taken up by Spanish architecture critics such as New York Times architecture critics Herbert Muschamp and Nicolai Ouroussof, in their arguments that the city needs to be "radically" reshaped by new towers. Discussing Spanish starchitect Santiago Calatrava's new skyscraper at 80 South Street near the foot of the Brooklyn Bridge, Ouroussof mentions how Calatrava's apartments are conceived as self-contained urban refuges, $30,000,000 prestige objects for the global elites: "If they differ in spirit from the Vanderbilt mansions of the past, it is only in that they promise to be more conspicuous. They are paradises for aesthetes."

== Historical overview of the status of architects ==
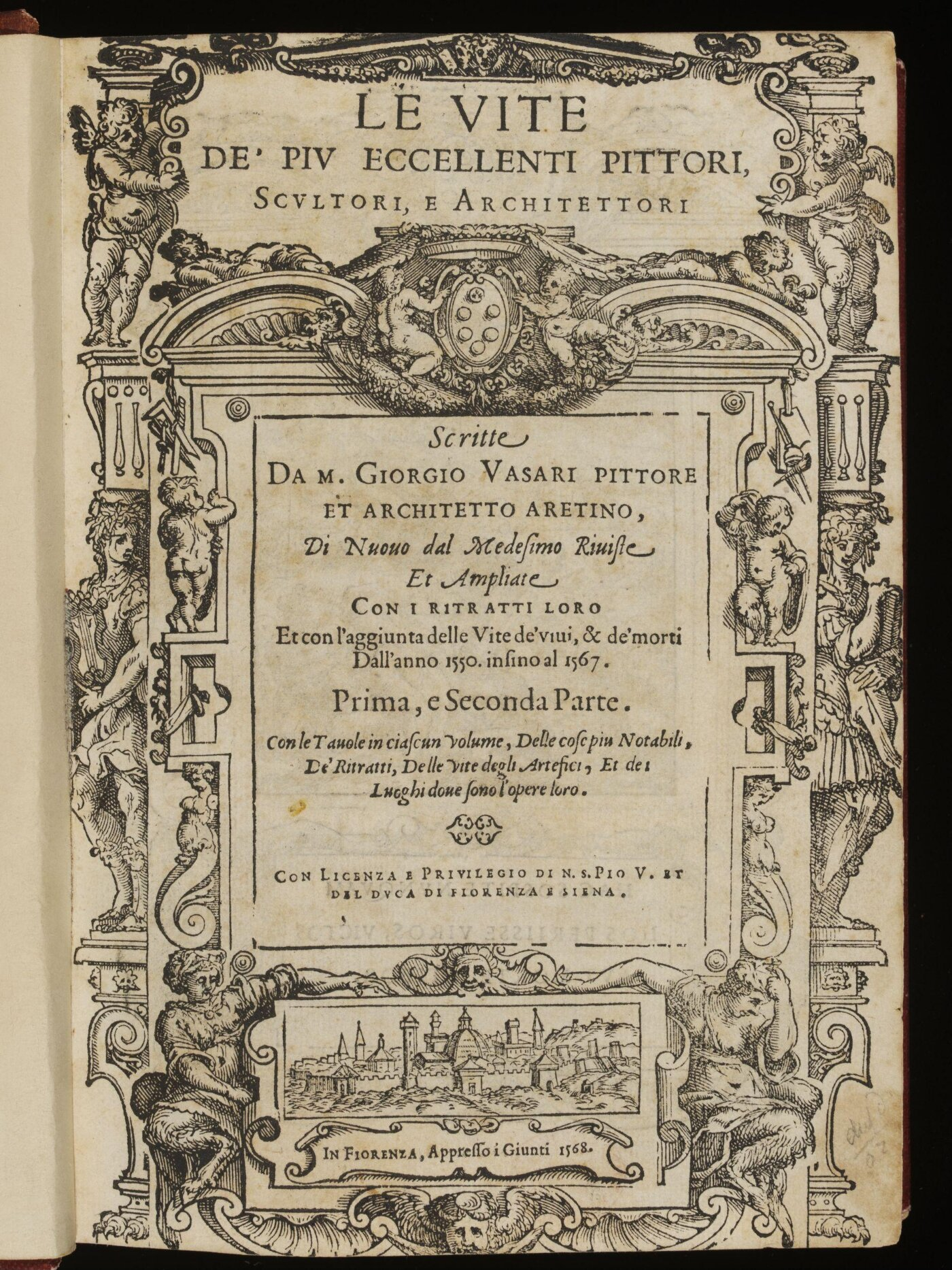
Title page of the 1568 edition of Le Vite

The notion of giving celebrity status to architects is not new, but is contained within the general tendency, from the Renaissance onwards, to give status to artists. Until the modern era, artists in Western civilization were generally working under a patron – usually the Church or the rulers of the state – and their reputation could become commodified, such that their services could be bought by different patrons. One of the first records of celebrity status is artist-architect Giorgio Vasari's monograph Le vite de' più eccellenti pittori, scultori e architettori (in English, Lives of the Most Excellent Painters, Sculptors, and Architects), first published in 1550, recording the Italian Renaissance at the time of its flourishment. Vasari, himself under the patronage of Grand Duke Cosimo I de' Medici, even favoured architects from the city where he resided, Florence, attributing to them innovation, while barely mentioning other cities or places further away. The importance of Vasari's book was in the ability to consolidate reputation and status without people actually having to see the works described. The development of media has thus been equally of central importance to architectural celebrity as other walks of life.

While status arising from patronage from the Church and State continued with the rise of Enlightenment and capitalism (e.g., the position of architect Christopher Wren in the patronage of the Crown, the City of London, the Church of England and the University of Oxford during the 17th century), there was an expansion in artistic and architectural services available, each competing for commissions with the growth of industry and the middle-classes. Architects nevertheless remained essentially servants to their clients: while Romanticism and Modernism in the other arts encouraged individualism, progress in architecture was geared mostly to improvements in building performance (standards of comfort), engineering and the development of new building typologies (e.g., factories, railway stations, and later airports) and public benevolence (the problems of urbanization, public housing, overcrowding, etc.), yet allowing some architects to concern themselves with architecture as an autonomous art (as flourished with Art Nouveau and Art Deco). The heroes of modern architecture, in particular Le Corbusier, were seen as heroic for generating theories about how architecture should be concerned with the development of society.

Such publicity also made it into the popular press: in the post-war era Time magazine occasionally featured architects on its front cover – for instance, in addition to Le Corbusier, Eero Saarinen, Frank Lloyd Wright, and Ludwig Mies van der Rohe. In more recent times Time magazine has also featured Philip Johnson, Peter Eisenman, Rem Koolhaas and Zaha Hadid. Eero Saarinen specialized in building headquarters for prestigious U.S. companies, such as General Motors, CBS, and IBM, and these companies used architecture to promote their corporate images: e.g., during the 1950s General Motors often photographed their new car models in front of their headquarters in Michigan. Corporations have continued to understand the value of bringing in starchitects to design their key buildings. For instance, the manufacturing company Vitra is well known for the works of notable architects that make up its premises in Weil am Rhein, Germany; including Zaha Hadid, Tadao Ando, SANAA, Herzog & de Meuron, Álvaro Siza, and Frank Gehry; as is the fashion house Prada for commissioning Rem Koolhaas to design their flagship stores in New York and Los Angeles. However, throughout history the greatest prestige has come with the design of public buildings – opera houses, libraries, townhalls, and especially museums, often referred to as the "new cathedrals" of our times.

== Measuring celebrity status ==
Objectivity in the question of status would seem questionable. However, researchers at Clarkson University have used the method of Google hits to 'measure' the degree of celebrity status: "to establish a precise mathematical definition of fame, both in the sciences and the world at large".

== Prizes and the consolidation of reputation ==
Although there are few architects well known to the general public, "starchitects" are held in the highest esteem by their professional colleagues and the professional media. Such status is marked not only by prestigious commissions but also by various prizes. For example, the Pritzker Prize, awarded since 1979, attempts to increase its own prestige by mentioning how its procedures are modeled on the Nobel Prize.

In his 1979 book Architecture and its Interpretation, Juan Pablo Bonta put forward a theory about how buildings and architects achieve canonic status. He argued that a building and its architect achieve iconic or canonic status after a period when various critics and historians build up an interpretation that then becomes unquestioned for a significant period. If the text itself receives canonical status, then the status of the architect is further endorsed. For example, in the first edition of Siegfried Giedion's book Space Time and Architecture (1949) the Finnish architect Alvar Aalto was not mentioned at all. In the second edition he received more attention than any other architect, including Le Corbusier, who until then had been understood as the most important modernist architect.

== See also ==
- Boosterism
