= Complex Projects Contract =

Construction and engineering contract

The CIOB Complex Projects Contract 2013 was a form of construction and engineering contract, developed by the Chartered Institute of Building (CIOB). Its formal name was the 'Contract for Use with Complex Projects, First Edition 2013'.

In November 2015, the Complex Projects Contract was updated by the Chartered Institute of Building in response to feedback from the industry. Despite effectively being a second edition, it was renamed the Time and Cost Management Contract 2015 (abbreviated to TCM15) to reflect the core strengths of the contract.

== Launch ==
Based upon extensive research carried out by the CIOB, the contract was formally launched on 23 April 2013. The contract was billed as the world's first contract specifically aimed at the management of time in complex construction and engineering projects. The authors also stated that it was the first form to follow the Society of Construction Law Delay and Disruption Protocol, and that it was also the first standard form contract to cater for Building Information Modelling (BIM) and the future of collaborative design.

== Purpose ==
It is suited for works of high value or complexity, major real estate projects and engineering or infrastructure projects. It is not suited to simpler works, those of short duration or with inexperienced clients /contractors. It anticipates Special Conditions for the particular requirements of each project and if using construction management as the procurement method, it cannot be used without the appropriate terms being included in the Special Conditions.

CPC2013 is designed for use by companies and public authorities in the UK and in any other country where works comprise complex building and / or engineering, which cannot reasonably be expected to be managed intuitively. It can be used where the contractor is expected to construct only that designed by or under the direction of the client with traditional drawings, specification and/or bills of quantities, or BIM, or on projects which require a contractor's design in part, or for design-build projects in which the contractor designs the whole of the works with or without an employer's reference design.

The contract requires a collaborative approach to the management of design, quality, time and cost. The working schedule, planning method statement and progress records (which are to be inspected and accepted by a competent project time manager and independently audited for quality assurance) are at the core of management. They are the tools by which all time and time-related cost issues are to be determined and are to conform with the standards required by the conditions, appendices and the CIOB's Guide to Good Practice in the Management of Time in Complex Projects.

== Collaboration ==
In order to promote collaboration and to ensure transparency of data, schedule and database submittals are to be made in native file format either by maintenance of the material in a common data environment or transfer by a file transfer protocol to all having a continuing design, administrative, or supervisory role, who are identified as Listed Persons. The contract also requires the appointment of a Contract Administrator to carry out administrative functions during the course of construction, a Project Time Manager to advise on time related matters, a Valuer to advise on cost matters, a Design Coordination Manager to manage the integration of the Contractor's design, and a Data Security Manager to supervise and maintain the integrity and security of digital communications.

== Risk management ==
Central to the philosophy of the Complex Projects Contract is its approach to transparency in risk management. CPC2013 provides for both the owner and contractor each to identify one or more time contingency allowance, which each can use as it wishes to manage its own risks. Unusually for a standard form construction contract, it defines "float" and provides that if either party creates free float or total float as a result of its own improvement of progress, that party may keep the created float as its own contingency. Additional powers are provided in CPC2013 to enable the construction project's developer, following consultation, to instruct acceleration, recovery and changes in resources sequences and logic in order to manage its risks contemporaneously.

== Time management ==
CPC2013 is distinctive in taking a prescriptive approach to the management of time and associated cost risk and combining critical path network techniques with resource-based planning. The time model, referred to as the Working Schedule, combines a high-density, short-term look-ahead similar in concept to that used in agile software development with medium and long-term lower density schedule along the lines of that used in the waterfall model planning technique, the whole being revised regularly on the Rolling Wave planning principle. In the short-term look-ahead, the logic is to be resource and location-related, instead of activity based, as it is in waterfall. The agile part of the schedule is to have its activity durations calculated by reference to the resources to be applied and their expected productivity.

== Cost management ==
The activities in the Working Schedule are also to be valued so that the Working Schedule also functions as the pricing schedule to predict current value for the purposes of interim payment and the ultimate out-turn cost for cost risk management purposes.

== Progress records ==
Progress is required to be recorded in a database identifying, at specified intervals, the resources used, productivity achieved and earned value. Apart from being the source data for subsequent progress update of the schedule, the database also serves for benchmarking productivity achievable for quality assurance of the schedule and future planning.

== Dispute resolution ==
The emphasis of CPC2013 is on contemporaneous Issue Resolution by an appropriate expert. CPC2013 it also provides for an escalating Dispute Resolution procedure, embracing negotiation, mediation, adjudication and arbitration. Where issues are required to be determined by Issue Resolution within a certain timescale, if the procedure is not invoked there are deeming provisions which determine the outcome of an issue. If Dispute Resolution is required, the expert, adjudicator or arbitrator are either those named in the contract or, in default, they are appointed by the Academy of Experts in London or the CIOB. The default adjudication rules are those of the Scheme for Construction Contracts and the default arbitration procedure is that of the London Court of International Arbitration.

== Ancillary publications ==
A back-to-back Consultancy Appointment and Subcontract, both of which followed the same principles of time and cost risk management, were published in November 2015 as part of the Time and Cost Management Contract 2015 suite.

== Industry reception ==
A number of reviews and commentaries have been written on the subject of the Complex Projects Contract. Some have criticized the complexity of the contract itself . whereas others have noted the benefits of the clear language, and have commented on the incorporation of its positive features. Reviews published have consistently commented that it will be necessary for the contract to be tested on a live project before the effectiveness can be proven.
