= BSRIA =

British profit for purpose technical organisation

BSRIA logo

BSRIA (it takes its name from the initial letters of the Building Services Research and Intelligence Association) is a UK-based testing, instrumentation, research and consultancy organisation, providing specialist services in construction and building services engineering. It is a profit for purpose, member-based association, with over 650 member companies; related services are delivered by a trading company, BSRIA Limited. Any profits made are invested in its research programme, producing best practice guidance.

BSRIA is a full member of the Construction Industry Council.

== Structure ==
BSRIA had a turnover of £11.8 million in 2010/11. It employs over 180 people at its UK head office in Bracknell as well as regionally based engineers in the UK and offices in France, Spain, Germany, China, Japan, Brazil and North America.

BSRIA's mission is

"to enable the building services and construction industries and their clients to enhance the value of the built environment, by improving the quality of their products and services, the efficiency of their provision and the effectiveness of their operation."

== History of BSRIA ==
BSRIA was formed in 1955 as the Heating and Ventilating Research Council, later to become the Heating and Ventilating Research Association. As the industry became increasingly linked with other services so its research association and professional body saw the need to widen their remit. In 1975 the 'building services' scope was adopted, marked by the formation of the Building Services Research and Information Association, commonly shortened to BSRIA, and, in 1976, the formation of the Chartered Institution of Building Services, renamed the Chartered Institution of Building Services Engineers (CIBSE) in 1985.

As the Association's activities developed to meet the needs of an integrated construction industry and to provide more than just research and information, the full name became less relevant. When new government rules required it to split research and other activities into two companies, BSRIA started formal use of the abbreviation.

Trading activities, including research, are now managed through a trading company, BSRIA Limited, which is a wholly owned subsidiary of the Building Services Research and Information Association, which is a company limited by guarantee. Thus, members – largely companies active in designing and delivering building services – join the Building Services Research and Information Association, and services are provided by BSRIA Limited.

== Timeline history ==
- 1955 (29 Dec) – The inaugural General Meeting of the Heating and Ventilating Research Council held at the Institution of Mechanical Engineers. The Chairman (C.S.K. Benham) summed up the proceedings by " Thank you, Gentlemen. Now we exist "
- 1956 – With almost 200 members, 3 research staff are appointed to work in rented premises at British Coal Utilisation Research Association, Leatherhead
- 1959 – The Heating and Ventilating Research Association (HVRA) was incorporated to take over the assets, liabilities and undertaking of the Heating and Ventilating Research Council, which was dissolved
- 1964 – Laboratories double in size.
- 1967 – Test Division established.
- 1973 – Establishment of Member Services and Technical Division to reflect 'customer / contractor ' ethos. The 'Application Guide' is launched to reflect members interest in the application of research.
- 1975 – 'Building Services Research and Information Association' name formally adopted. Instrument Hire service established with 120 hirings. First Statistics Bulletin published.
- 1986–87 – "Research Clubs" established to match DoE funds for projects. BEMS (Building Energy Management Systems) Centre established as autonomous centre of expertise. Air Infiltration Centre renamed to Air Infiltration and Ventilation Centre to reflect widening role.
- 1989 – EuroCentre established to help industry take advantage of the single European market.
- 1993 – Second site established at Crowthorne giving 50% more space. New radiator test room for testing to new European standard.
- 2000 – The Association establishes a trading company – BSRIA Ltd – to undertake all the trading activities, including research.
- 2003 – Acquisition of new offices adjacent to existing laboratories to accommodate staff relocated from Crowthorne.
- 2006 – Offices set up in France, Spain and Germany.
- 2008 – New subsidiary, BSRIA Construction Consulting (Beijing), established. Acquisition of market research business 'Proplan' to develop market intelligence in controls, fire protection and security.
- 2011 – New subsidiary, BSRIA Cert established to provide independent certification of products and services.
- 2025 – BSRIA changes its name from 'Building Services Research and Information Association' to 'Building Services Research and Intelligence Association'

== Founding members ==
The following companies were the founding members of BSRIA who remain as members now (original company names updated to current):

- BRE
- Chartered Institution of Building Services Engineers (CIBSE)
- Comyn Ching & Co. (Solray) Ltd
- Crown House Technologies Ltd
- EMCOR Group (UK) Plc
- Faber Maunsell (now AECOM's UK subsidiary)
- Flakt Woods Ltd
- Gratte Brothers Ltd
- Haden Young (part of Balfour Beatty)
- Harry Taylor
- Hoare Lea
- Honeywell Control Systems Ltd
- Inviron Ltd
- Jacobs Babtie
- Lennox Europe
- C H Lindsey & Son
- London South Bank University
- MJN Colston Ltd
- Pearce Buckle (Design Engineers) Ltd
- R W Gregory LLP
- Roger Preston & Partners
- Rosser & Russell Building Services Ltd
- Skanska
- TPS
- WSP Group plc

BSRIA now has over 600 corporate members.
