= Pricing schedule =

A pricing schedule is a function that maps the quantity of a good purchased to the total price paid.

== Types of pricing schedules ==
- Linear Pricing Schedule - A pricing schedule in which there is a fixed price per unit, such that where total price paid is represented by T(q), quantity is represented by q and price per unit is represented by a constant p, T(q) = pq
- Nonlinear Pricing Schedule - Nonlinear pricing is a pricing schedule in which quantity and total price are not mapped to each other in a strictly linear fashion
  - Affine Pricing - An affine pricing schedule consists of both a fixed cost and a cost per unit. Using the same notation as above, T(q) = k + pq, where k is a constant cost.
