= Design quality indicator =

Design quality toolkit

The Design Quality Indicator (DQI) is a toolkit to measure, evaluate and improve the design quality of buildings.

Development of DQI was started in the United Kingdom by the Construction Industry Council (CIC) in 1999. It was initiated in response to the success of Key Performance Indicators devised for assessing construction process issues such as timely completion, financial control and safety on site by the construction industry's Movement for Innovation (M4I). The aim of the DQI systems was to ensure that the M4I's indicators of construction process were balanced by an assessment of the building as a product. The Science Policy Research Unit at the University of Sussex was commissioned to develop the indicator tool, which was launched as an online resource on 1 October 2003. In 2004 the DQI received recognition from the British Institute of Facilities Management for the role of involving users in the design process. The DQI tool was made available to users in the United States in 2006, and an online American version was launched on 20 October 2008.

Unlike its forerunner the Housing Quality Indicator (HQI) system devised for the UK's Department for the Environment, Transport and the Regions (DETR) by the consultancy DEGW and published on open access in February 1999, the DQI system instead could be used only by approved facilitators. The criteria and the method of assessment, which though unacknowledged is a simple form of multi-attribute utility analysis, remained inaccessible to design teams and their clients unless they employed a facilitator licensed to use it. Guidance on using the HQI system can be found on the government website. The DQI version for hospitals is also on open access on the national archive.

== Conceptual framework ==
DQI applies a structured approach to assess design quality based on the model by the architect Vitruvius, the Roman author of the earliest surviving theoretical treatise on building in Western culture, who described design in terms of utilitas, firmitas and venustas, often translated as commodity, firmness and delight. DQI uses a modern-day interpretation of these terms as:

- Functionality (utilitas) – the arrangement, quality and interrelationship of spaces and how the building is designed to be useful to all.
- Build Quality (firmitas) – the engineering performance of the building, which includes structural stability and the integration, safety and robustness of the systems, finishes and fittings.
- Impact (venustas) – the building's ability to create a sense of place and have a positive effect on the local community and environment.

== Methodology ==
DQI is completed by a range of stakeholders in the briefing and design stages of a building project, or on a completed building. Stakeholders who participate include:

- Architects
- Building users (or potential users)
- Building clients
- Facilities managers (or future facilities managers)
- Project managers
- Quantity surveyors (Cost engineer)
- Structural and building services engineers

DQI is applied in a facilitated workshop that is led by a certified DQI facilitator.

== Models and related approaches ==
There are three models of design quality indicator:

- DQI which is applicable to all building types
- DQI for schools which is applicable to school buildings. This model of DQI is being used on all current school projects in the UK and forms part of the Department for Children, Schools and Families 'Minimum Design Standard' for new school buildings.
- DQI for health buildings which was released in beta format in June 2012 on the DQI website.

== Other references ==
- Whyte, J and Gann, D (2003), Design Quality Indicators: work in progress: Building Research and Information, London: Spon Press. doi:10.1080/0961321032000107537
- Markus, T. (2003), Lessons from the Design Quality Indicator: Building Research and Information, London: Spon Press. doi:10.1080/0961321032000088016
- Thomson at al. (2003), Managing value and quality in design: Building Research and Information, London: Spon Press. doi:10.1080/0961321032000087981
- Prasad, S. (2004) 'Inclusive maps', in Designing Better Buildings: quality and value in the built environment edited by Macmillan, S. London: Spon Press ISBN 0-415-31525-5
- Dickson, M. (2004) 'Achieving quality in building design by intention', in Designing Better Buildings: quality and value in the built environment edited by Macmillan, S. London: Spon Press ISBN 0-415-31525-5
- Whyte, J Gann, D and Salter, A (2004) 'Building indicators of design quality', in Designing Better Buildings: quality and value in the built environment edited by Macmillan, S. London: Spon Press ISBN 0-415-31525-5
- Prasad, S. (2004), Clarifying intentions: the design quality indicator: Building Research and Information, London: Spon Press. doi:10.1080/0961321042000312376
- Cole, R. (2005), Building environmental assessment methods: redefining intentions and roles: Building Research and Information, London: Spon Press. doi:10.1080/09613210500219063
- Kaatz, E., Root, D. and Bowen, P (2005), Broadening project participation through a modified building sustainability assessment: Building Research & Information, London: Spon Press. doi:10.1080/09613210500219113
- Commission for Architecture and the Built Environment (2009), Case study: International Digital Laboratory, University of Warwick, Coventry
- Commission for Architecture and the Built Environment (2009), Case study: Maples Respite Centre, Harlow, Essex
- Commission for Architecture and the Built Environment (2009), Case study: St Nicholas Church of England Primary School, Essex
- Commission for Architecture and the Built Environment (2009), Case study: British Library Centre for Conservation, London
- Commission for Architecture and the Built Environment (2009), Case study: Frederick Bremer School, Waltham Forest London
