= Building Services Engineering Research and Technology =

- Discipline: Building services engineering
- Language: English
- Edited by: Andy Shea

Publication details
- History: 1980–present
- Publisher: SAGE Publishing on behalf of the Chartered Institution of Building Services Engineers
- Frequency: Bimonthly
- Impact factor: 2.473 (2021)

Standard abbreviations
- ISO 4: Build. Serv. Eng. Res. Technol.

Indexing
- ISSN: 0143-6244 (print); 1477-0849 (web)
- LCCN: 81645851
- OCLC no.: 7859922

Links
- Journal homepage; Online access; Online archive

Building Services Engineering Research and Technology is a bimonthly peer-reviewed scientific journal that covers the field of building services engineering. The journal was established in 1980 and is published by SAGE Publishing on behalf of the Chartered Institution of Building Services Engineers.

== Abstracting and indexing ==
The journal is abstracted and indexed in Scopus and the Science Citation Index Expanded. According to the Journal Citation Reports, its 2021 impact factor is 2.473.
