= Yang Wei =

Yang Wei or Wei Yang may refer to:

- Shang Yang or Wei Yang (Chinese: 衞鞅; c. 390–338 BCE), ancient Chinese philosopher and politician
- Yang Longyan (897–920) or Yang Wei (楊渭), King of Wu of the Five Dynasties and Ten Kingdoms Period
- Yang Wei (engineer) (杨卫, born 1954), president of Zhejiang University
- Yang Wei (aircraft designer) (杨伟, born 1963), Chinese aircraft designer
- Wei Yang (biologist) (杨薇, born 1963), Chinese-American biologist
- Wei Yang (urban designer) (born 1974), Chinese-British urban designer
- Yang Wei (badminton) (杨维, born 1979), Chinese badminton player
- Yang Wei (gymnast) (杨威, born 1980), Chinese gymnast
- Chinese cruiser Yangwei, a late Qing-dynasty warship with the Beiyang Fleet
