= CIOB =

CIOB may stand for the following:

- Chartered Institute of Building, United Kingdom
- Chemin de Fer Impérial Ottoman de Baghdad — The Baghdad Railway
- Central Indian Ocean Basin, an abyssal plain
