= Invoice price =

The invoice price is the actual price that the end-customer retailer pays to the manufacturer or distributor for a product.

However, in many industries, the "invoice cost" actually varies from the "net purchase cost," or the actual price of a product. The invoice cost of a product is the price that the merchant pays for the product before marking it up to sell. The invoice cost is sometimes used in industries such as automobile sales to entice customers to buy.

== Overview ==
The net purchase cost of a product is the amount of the invoice plus any additional fees and taxes that are incurred. Business owners can negotiate the purchase price of a product if they know what the net purchase price is in comparison to the invoice price. This is not always easy to do, but it should be apparent, at least following the first purchase of a product. Any fees or taxes added to the invoice price indicate the additional fees that are being tacked on to the price. If purchasing a product in a large volume, it may be possible for the manufacturer to waive some of these costs for a large enough order. If a car dealer has additional incentives available for the purchase of a vehicle, he generally discounts the vehicle below the invoice price. This should be seen as a sign for the buyer that additional room for negotiation may exist.

Different methods exist in accounting for recording the purchase of a product bought at the invoice price. One method, the gross method, involves simply recording the full amount of the invoice as a debit to accounts payable and a corresponding credit to cash. If any discounts are given, they are itemized as a separate credit to cash, plus the purchase price. The net method, on the other hand, begins with the purchase price, including any discounts, which are then debited to purchases in the accounting ledger. A corresponding credit is then made to accounts payable.

== Trade price or Wholesale price ==
Sometimes invoice price is used to indicate the trade or wholesale price although they are not the same. The wholesale or trade price is the price at which goods are sold to shops by the people who produce them, rather than the price which the customer usually pays in the shop.

Simplified it could be called the cost of a good sold by a wholesaler. The wholesaler will usually charge a price somewhat higher than he or she paid to the producer, and the retailer who purchases the goods from the wholesaler will increase the price again when they sell the goods in their store. That price is usually called the manufacturer's suggested retail price (MSRP), list price or recommended retail price (RRP) of a product and is the price which the manufacturer recommends that the retailer sell the product for. The retail price is normally around 2.5 to 3 x the trade or wholesale price, depending on the markup of the retailer since the retailer really needs this markup to cover their own higher overheads such as the shop rent, taxes, business rates and staff.

This is the price businesses charge to trade buyers. This is their cost price plus a markup or profit margin. As a guideline: this is normally around 2 x the cost price. But if the cost price is relatively high then it’s less. So for example, if your cost price would be £150, then your trade/wholesale price would be around £250.

== Price for profit at the wholesale rate ==
Once the wholesale price is set, businesses normally double that price to create a retail price (“suggested retail price” to your wholesale customers). When selling the product on an ecommerce site, businesses normally use the retail price. The wholesale price should cover time, labor, materials, overhead, employees, etc.

- Labor: Labor is not negotiable. Needs to have room for flexibility due to longer lead-time to influence this cost.
- Cost of goods and materials: used to create your product, including tools.
- Overhead: rent, utilities, supplies, phone, etc.
- Profit: the margin needed to reinvest in the business.

== See also ==
- Affine pricing
