= Sunand Prasad =

Sunand Prasad OBE
- Born: 1950 (age 75–76); Sevagram, India
- Occupation: Architect
- Practice: Penoyre & Prasad LLP

Sunand Prasad OBE (born 1950, in Sevagram, India) is a British architect and senior partner of architectural practice Penoyre & Prasad, a multi sectoral practice with an internationally recognised profile in health, education and civic buildings. He is a past President of the Royal Institute of British Architects (RIBA).

== Early life and education ==
Prasad was brought up in central India and came with his family to the UK in 1962 when he was 12 years old. He was educated at the University of Cambridge, The Architectural Association and obtained a PhD from the Royal College of Art.

== Career ==
Prasad co-founded Penoyre & Prasad in 1988 with Greg Penoyre.

In 2008 Prasad was appointed a member of the Mayor's Design Advisory Panel for London. He served two terms as a member of the Mayor of London’s Fourth Plinth Commissioning Group helping select art works for Trafalgar Square.

He is a trustee of the think tank Centre for Cities and of Article 25, a charity set up in response to the 2005 Indian Ocean earthquake and is currently President of the Architects Benevolent Society.

From 2007 to 2009 Prasad was President of the RIBA.

He has campaigned on issues relating to climate change and the built environment and was listed 26th in the Independent's 2008 Green List.

In 2008 as part of the Cape Farewell programme, Prasad travelled to Greenland with a team of artists and scientists, creating an art installation that has been exhibited through the travelling exhibition 'Unfold'. He became a Trustee of Cape Farewell in 2010.

Prasad was a founding Commissioner of the UK Government's Commission for Architecture and the Built Environment (CABE); launched its Enabling Programme and later led its work on Skills. He was involved in the development of the Construction Industry Council’s Design Quality Indicator.

Prasad has campaigned for an equitable and effective climate treaty. He was a member of the Steering Committee of the UK Government's Innovation & Growth Team on Low Carbon construction which reported in November 2010.

Prasad has contributed extensively to books and journals on a variety of subjects. He has been involved in teaching, lecturing and acting as an external examiner.

He was appointed an Officer of the Order of the British Empire (OBE) in the 2023 Birthday Honours for services to regeneration.
