= Graham Clive Watts =

Graham Clive Watts OBE FRSA FRIBA
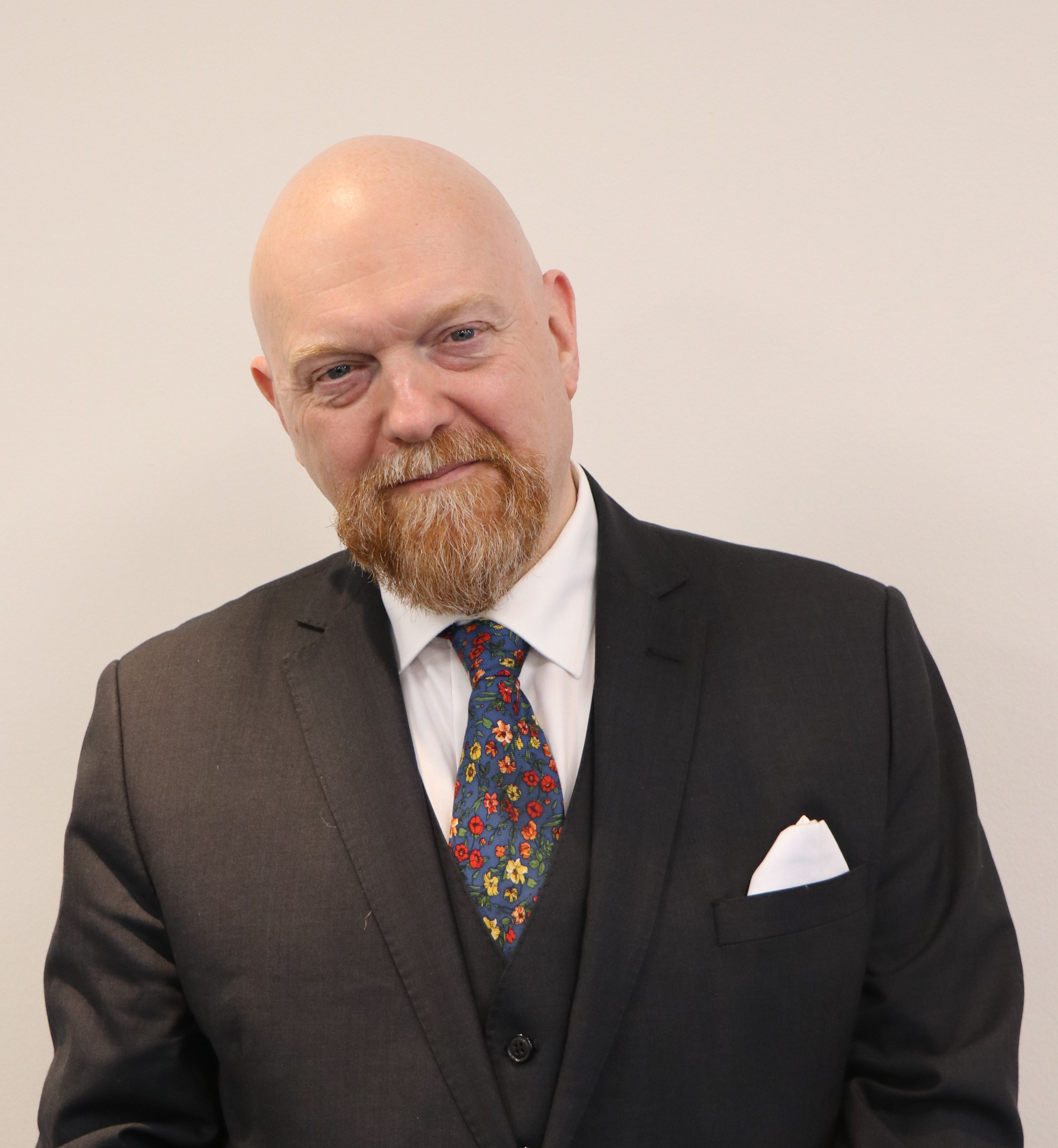
- Born: 5 August 1956
- Education: Bedford Modern School
- Alma mater: Westfield College, London; University College, Chichester
- Known for: Chief Executive of the Construction Industry Council since 1991; Olympic Team Manager for GB Fencing (2001-2010); Chairman of the National Dance Awards

Graham Clive Watts OBE MCMI FRSA MRICS FRIBA CIBSE (born 5 August 1956) is chief executive of the Construction Industry Council. He was also manager of Great Britain's fencing team at the 2004 and 2008 Summer Olympics and chairman of the National Dance Awards. He was awarded the OBE in 2008.

== Life ==
Watts was born on 5 August 1956 and educated at Bedford Modern School, Westfield College, London and University College, Chichester.

Watts was chief executive of the Society of Architectural and Associated Technicians from 1983 to 1986, chief executive of the British Institute of Architectural Technicians from 1986 to 1991 and since then has been chief executive of the Construction Industry Council. He chaired the Competence Steering Group which produced the Setting the Bar report (2020), concerned with enhancing the competence of professionals working on the development of higher risk buildings in the light of the Grenfell Tower tragedy in 2017.

Outside of his professional work, Watts competed for England and Great Britain's fencing teams, winning a Commonwealth Fencing Championships team bronze medal in 1990, and captaining the British sabre team at the 1992 Summer Olympics in Barcelona. He later became manager of the British fencing team (1995–2010) and Olympic team manager for fencing (2001–2010). Watts was also made chairman of the National Dance Awards in 2011. In late 2019 he joined the board of trustees of the Spanish Theatre Company and the Cervantes Theatre London, and was appointed chair of the board of trustees in early 2020.

Watts was awarded an honorary doctorate by the University College of Estate Management in December 2022.
