= Peter Edward Trench =

British developer and politician

Sir Peter Edward Trench CBE TD JP (16 June 1918 – 10 September 2006) was a British developer and Liberal Party politician.

== Background ==
He was a son of Lt-Col. James Knights Trench, managing director of the Sandoz Chemical Company Limited and Grace Sim of Bradford. He was educated privately, at the London School of Economics, London University and St John’s College, Cambridge where he was awarded a BSc (Econ.) Hons. He married, in 1940, Mary St Clair Morford. They had one son and one daughter. Mary died in 2004. He was awarded an OBE in 1945, a CBE in 1964 and he was knighted in 1979.

== Second World War ==
He served in The Queen’s Royal Regiment from 1939–46. He was at the Battle of Dunkirk. He went on a special mission to Italy. In 1944 he was on Field-Marshal Montgomery's staff. He reached the rank of Lieutenant-Colonel.

== Political career ==
At the age of 27 he was Liberal candidate for the Bradford Central Division of West Yorkshire at the 1945 General Election, finishing third. He did not stand for parliament again. The Liberal Party in Bradford had been dominated by the Liberal Nationals who favoured close co-operation with the Conservative party. However Trench was opposed to this arrangement and stood against a Conservative candidate. He openly criticised those Liberal Nationals who aligned themselves with the Conservatives.

He served as a Justice of the Peace in Inner London from 1963–1971. He was a part-time Member of the National Board for Prices and Incomes from 1965–68.

== Professional career ==
He went into the building and construction business, running a string of construction companies. He was a member of the Chartered Institute of Building. He was Director of the National Federation of Building Trades Employers from 1959–64.
