= Nonlinear pricing =

Concept in economics

Nonlinear pricing is a broad term that covers any kind of price structure in which there is a nonlinear relationship between price and the quantity of goods. An example is affine pricing. A nonlinear price schedule is a menu of different-sized bundles at different prices, from which the consumer makes his selection. In such schedules, the larger bundle generally sells for a higher total price but a lower per-unit price than a smaller bundle.

== See also ==
- Two part tariff
- Second degree price discrimination
