= Standard time in manufacturing =

Standard time is the amount of time that should be allowed for an average worker to process one work unit using the standard method and working at a normal pace. The standard time includes some additional time, called the contingency allowance, to provide for the worker's personal needs, fatigue, and unavoidable delays during the shift.

== Prerequisite for Valid Time Standards ==
- The task is performed by an average worker
- The worker's pace represents standard performance
- The worker uses the standard method
- The task is performed on a standard work unit

== Calculating the Standard Time ==
The standard time (Ts) is calculated from multiplying the observed time (To) by the performance rating (R) and the personal need, fatigue and unavoidable delays (PFD): Ts = To*R*(1+PFD)

== Usages for Standard Time ==
- Estimate the quantity of the production
- Determine workforce size and equipment requirement
- Compare alternative methods
- Evaluate worker's performance
- Plan and schedule production and estimate co.
