= Chartered Institute of Building =

UK professional body

The Chartered Institute of Building
- Abbreviation: CIOB
- Formation: 1834
- Type: Professional Body
- Legal status: Registered Charity
- Purpose: Promotion for the public benefit the science and practice of building.
- Headquarters: 3 Arlington Square, Downshire Way, Bracknell, Berkshire, RG12 1WA, UK
- Coordinates: 51°24′28″N 0°41′27″W
- Region served: Worldwide
- Members: c.51,000
- Chief Executive: Victoria Hills
- Main organ: Board of Trustees
- Staff: c.190
- Website: www.ciob.org
- Remarks: Built environment
- Formerly called: The Institute of Building

The Chartered Institute of Building (CIOB) is a global organisation which exists to promote and advance for the public benefit the science and practice of building and construction. Originating in 1834 as the Builders Society and incorporated in 1884 as The Institute of Builders, the institute was renamed the Institute of Building in 1965 and granted its royal charter of incorporation in September, 1980.

CIOB's Academy establishes standards and conducts training courses in practices and disciplines of the construction industry, providing support, guidance and formal qualifications to individuals and companies. Designations of MCIOB (Member) and FCIOB (Fellow) are attainable by members who may also achieve qualification as "Chartered Builder" or "Chartered Construction Manager".

The institute has some 45,000 members of whom 80 per cent reside in the UK and the others are in branches established in over 100 countries.

CIOB is a full member of the Construction Industry Council.

== History ==
The CIOB was established in London on 6 March 1834 as the Builders Society by an eminent group of 15 Master Builders that included Thomas Cubitt and William Cubitt, to suppress trade unions and to: "uphold and promote reputable standards of building through friendly intercourse, the useful exchange of information and greater uniformity and respectability in business".

By 1867, it had become The London Master Builders Society and had 76 members. In 1884, the society was incorporated under the Companies Act as The Institute of Builders, the principal objective being "to promote excellence in the construction of buildings and just and honourable practice in the conduct of business". From 1886, the Institute had offices at 31-32 Bedford Street in London, along with the Central Association of Master Builders of London and the Builders' Accident Insurance Company.

Following substantial development, particularly in the years following the Second World War, The Institute of Builders changed its name in 1965 to The Institute of Building and, in 1970, adopted new objectives of a broader and more professional character. That year it also registered as an educational charity.

The Institute of Building was granted a Royal Charter on 25 September 1980, thereby achieving its current name: The Chartered Institute of Building.

The CIOB (along with the CIBSE, IstructE, RIBA, and RICS) was a founder member of the Building Industry Council, today the Construction Industry Council, in 1988.

== Global spread ==
The CIOB is headquartered in the UK with branches throughout the world. Approximately 20% of its members are located overseas with representation in over 100 countries worldwide with offices in Australia, China, Hong Kong, Malaysia, Singapore, South Africa, and The Middle East. The CIOB has also formed international agreements with several overseas organisations.

== Membership ==
The CIOB has over 50,000 members worldwide. Members are drawn from a wide range of professional disciplines working within the built environment, including clients, consultants, and contractors as well specialists in regulation, research, and education. There are two categories of members: Corporate and Non-Corporate.

Members must undertake Continuing Professional Development throughout the life of their membership following the CIOB guidelines to maintain their professional status and to fulfill their professional obligations.

=== Designations/ Post-nominal letters ===
The following designatory letters may be used by members of the CIOB:

- Members may use "MCIOB".
- Fellows may use "FCIOB".
- Technical members may use "TechCIOB".

Members and Fellows of CIOB may describe themselves as a "Chartered Builder" or "Chartered Construction Manager". The Council of Mortgage Lenders (CML) accredit MCIOB and FCIOB qualifications enabling the formal issue of the CML Professional Consultants Certificate (PCC).

== Education ==
The CIOB develops educational standards in construction and has an accreditation process for universities and colleges seeking recognition of their (university/college) courses.

=== Apprenticeships assessment ===
The Chartered Institute of Building (CIOB) in February 2022 was successfully accepted on the Education and Skills Funding Agency (ESFA) register of end-point assessment organisations (EPAOs). This means CIOB can deliver end-point assessments (EPA) for all apprentices registered onto the Level 6 Construction Site Management standard.

== Campaign activities ==
The institute campaigns on current issues, including eradicating modern slavery from the industry, improving the quality of the built environment, ensuring the right skills, talent and behaviours are nurtured in construction, and that our environment is protected through more energy-efficient buildings and less-wasteful construction practices.

== Contract forms ==
Several standard forms of contract have been developed for use by the construction industry, including:

- CIOB Facilities Management Contract, 2008
- Agreement for the appointment of planning supervisor - scope of service, 2004
- Mini form of contract
- Minor works contract
- Complex Projects Contract

== Notable members ==
Notable members of the CIOB include:

- Sir Ove Arup
- Sir Herbert Bartlett
- Sir Winston Churchill (honorary fellowship, 1961)
- Thomas Cubitt
- William Cubitt
- Sir Manuel Hornibrook (honorary member)
- Sir Maurice Laing
- Sir Frank Lampl
- Sir Michael Latham
- Sir Edwin Lutyens
- Sir Samuel Morton Peto
- Sir Peter Trench
- Sir James Wates

== See also ==
- Royal Town Planning Institute
- Chartered Association of Building Engineers
