= Montpelier High School, Bristol =

Montpelier High School
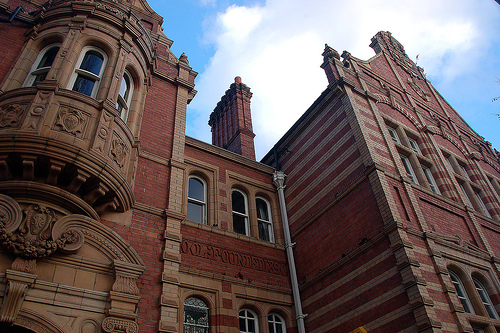

Location
- Cheltenham Road; Montpelier; Bristol, BS6 5RD; England; 51.467643°N 2.591189°W

Information
- Type: Academy
- Local authority: Bristol City Council
- Trust: Venturers Trust
- Department for Education URN: 135581 Tables
- Ofsted: Reports
- Principal: Vanetta Spence
- Gender: Girls
- Age: 11 to 18 (inc V6 sixth form)
- Enrolment: 912 (inc V6) (Data from January 2016)
- Capacity: 700 (Y7-11) (Data from Dec 2023)
- Houses: 5
- Website: www.montpschool.org

Montpelier High School (formerly Colston's Girls' School) is a girls secondary Academy, located in the Montpelier area of Bristol, England. The school building was designed by William Venn Gough and dates from 1891. It uses a polychrome mix of various Northern Renaissance styles, built in red Cattybrook brick with yellow brick and buff terracotta dressings, and has been designated by English Heritage as a grade II listed building.

== History ==
Colston's Girls' School opened in 1891. It was founded with endowments left by the Bristol-born merchant, philanthropist, slave trader and Member of Parliament, Edward Colston (1636–1721), and named after him.

From 1945 to 1966 the school was a direct grant grammar school with an entrance exam. In 1947 Colston's Girls Junior School became a state school, named Colston's Primary School. In 1966 it chose to become a selective private school until in September 2008 voluntarily converting to a state-funded Academy specialising in languages. This agreement was announced in July 2007 and sponsored by the Society of Merchant Venturers. In accord with the funding agreement, the admissions criteria are not based on how close pupils live to the school. Priority is given to looked after/previously looked after children, and siblings of existing pupils. Most of the remaining places are allocated on a random basis to children who live in Bristol, with a quarter of places randomly allocated to applicants in the districts surrounding Bristol (approximating to the former county of Avon).

The school mottos are; We cherish our history but look to the future, and Go and do thou likewise taken from the biblical story of the Good Samaritan. It is a multi-faith school.

The school encourages the arts and sports, with teams entering competitions and tournaments across the country in sports such as athletics, hockey, and netball. An annual exhibition of the girls' art work is also displayed at Bristol Guild of Applied Art.

In 2013 the agreed intake increased to 140 pupils, with a sixth form maximum of 180 pupils, from an original academy intake of 112 pupils with a 160 pupil sixth form.

The headteacher until 2017, Alistair Perry, was convicted in 2018 of indecently assaulting a 16-year-old girl in 2000, while he was Head of History at the school.

In November 2017, after decades of debates, Colston's Girls' School announced that it was not going to drop the name of Colston because it was of "no benefit" to the school to do so. The headteacher, John Whitehead, later stated that he was overruled on this matter by the Society of Merchant Venturers. On 6 November 2020, after the toppling of the Statue of Edward Colston in Bristol and a consultation with staff and students, the name of the school was changed to Montpelier High School with effect from September 2021. The school is situated in the Montpelier area of the city.

On 10 June 2022 Ofsted rated the school as 'Inadequate' – the lowest possible rating – after being rated 'Outstanding' 12 years prior. Whilst the diversity and enrichment clubs were commended, the main issues highlighted were surrounding safeguarding of the pupils, with comments made in reference to how the students did not feel safe at the school and as though they did not have an appropriate adult to confide in, as well as bullying issues with inconsistent responses from staff. The curriculum was also highlighted as something in need of improvement, citing a lack of ambition in particular for the Sixth Form and a lack of support for disabled children, those who struggle with reading and those with special needs. Then principal, Kerry McCullagh, was described as 'disappointed' and 'shocked' with the result, understanding that parents were noticeably going to feel 'let down' by the report. In response she outlined a 20-point plan which involves higher focus on phonics and reinforcement of staff being safety support for the pupils.

== Academic achievement ==
The table below shows the percentage of students achieving the key measure of 5 A*-C GCSE including English and Mathematics between 2009 and 2012.

2009	2010	2011	2012
85%	91%	94%	32%

== Notable former pupils ==
- Joan Barton, poet
- Florrie, singer-songwriter
- Philippa Gregory, novelist
- Lily Newton, professor of botany and former vice-principal at the University of Wales
- April Pearson, actress
- Brenda Ryman, biochemist and principal (Girton College)
- Audrey Stuckes, material scientist and lecturer at the University of Salford
- Mary Tanner, academic

== Notable former staff ==
- Mary Green, former headteacher
