= Penoyre & Prasad =

British architectural practice

Penoyre & Prasad LLP

Practice information
- Key architects: Sunand Prasad; Greg Penoyre
- Founded: 1988
- Location: London

Significant works and honors
- Buildings: Richard Desmond Children's Eye Centre
- Awards: Healthcare Building of the Year 2009

Penoyre & Prasad is an architectural practice based in London. It was established in 1988 by Sunand Prasad and Greg Penoyre. The practice has an interest in low energy and sustainability. In 2007 Sunand Prasad became president of the Royal Institute of British Architects.

The practice has designed many public buildings, with the Richard Desmond Children's Eye Centre at London's Moorfields Eye Hospital winning the World Architecture News Healthcare Building of the Year 2009. The 2006 Ashburton Learning Village in Croydon includes many sustainable design features.

The work of the practice was published in a 2007 book titled: Transformations: the architecture of Penoyre & Prasad.
