= Wei Yang (urban designer) =

Chinese-British town planner and urban designer, born 1974

Wei Yang OBE FAcSS FRTPI
- 杨威
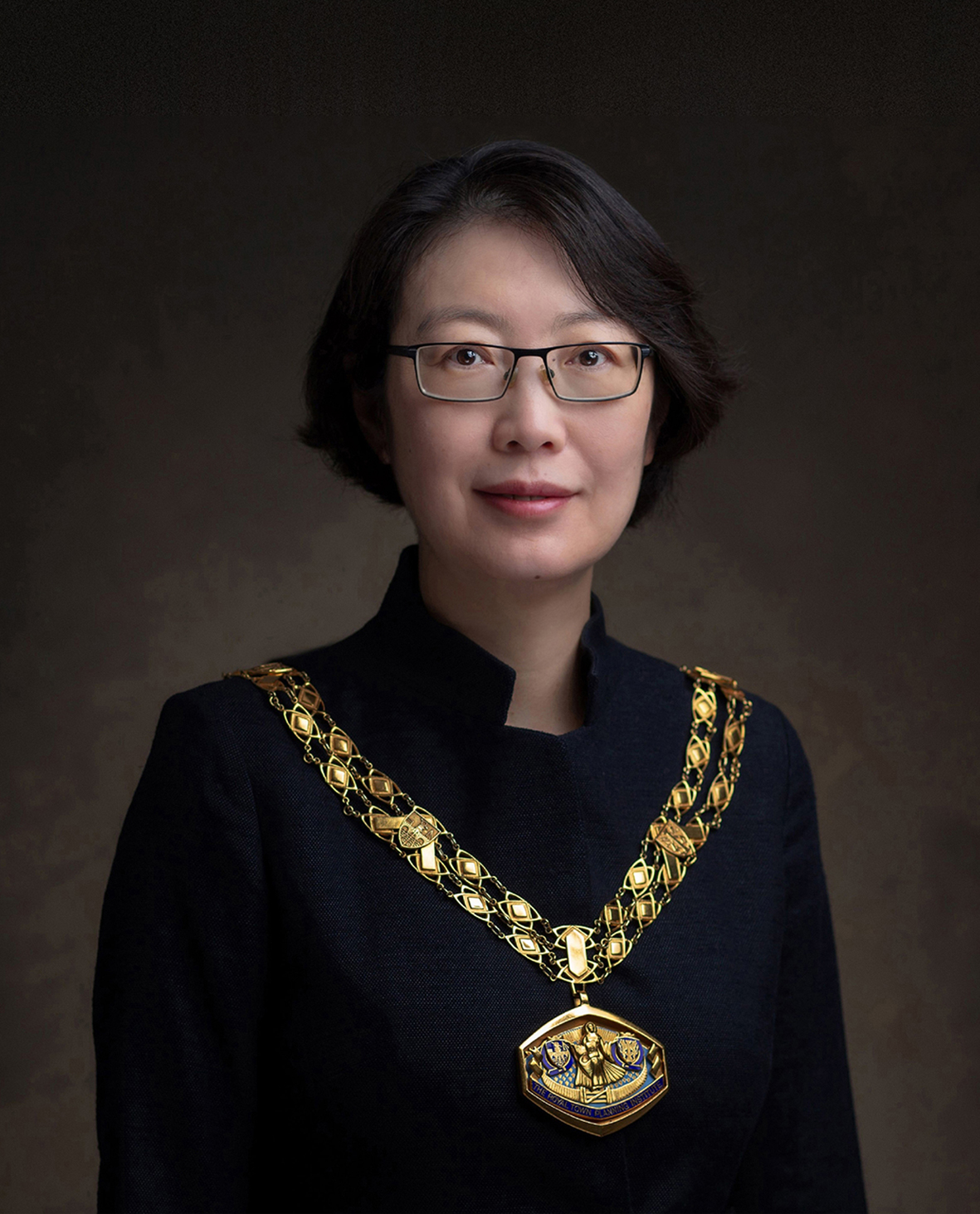
- Born: 1974 (age 51–52); Beijing, China
- Education: Town Planner; Urban Designer
- Alma mater: Xi'an University of Architecture and Technology; University of Sheffield
- Occupations: Town planner & urban designer
- Organization(s): Wei Yang & Partners, Digital Task Force for Planning
- Known for: 21st Century Garden City approach, Modernisation and Digitalisation of Planning Profession
- Website: www.weiyangandpartners.co.uk,www.digital4planning.com

Wei Yang OBE (born 1974) is a Chinese-British town planner, urban designer, author, and scholar. She is the founder of Wei Yang & Partners and the co-founder and CEO of the Digital Task Force for Planning in London.

Yang is known for her work on the 21st Century Garden City approach and for promoting integrated thinking across the built and natural environment sectors. Leading the modernisation and digital transformation of the planning profession, she developed a digitally enabled methodology for spatial planning.

Yang served as President of the Royal Town Planning Institute in 2021. She champions a revival of spirit for a modernised planning profession, emphasising systemic approaches to global challenges and the pursuit of collective wellbeing.

She is an Honorary Professor at University College London, a board member of the British Library, and a member of UN Habitat World Urban Campaign Steering Committee. From 2023 to 2025 she chaired the Construction Industry Council in the UK.

In September 2024, Yang was appointed to the UK Government's New Towns Taskforce, whose Report to Government (New Towns Taskforce, 2025) was published on 28 September 2025.

Yang was appointed Officer of the Order of the British Empire (OBE) in the 2025 New Year Honours for services to town planning.

== Early life and education ==
Wei Yang (Chinese: 杨威) was born in Beijing. She studied urban planning at Xi'an University of Architecture and Technology, receiving a bachelor's degree in 1996. Between 1996 and 1997, she volunteered with the Chinese vernacular architecture Research Group led by architectural historian Professor Chen Zhihua at Tsinghua University.

From 1999 to 2005, Yang studied at the University of Sheffield, earning a master of science degree in 2001 and a doctor of philosophy degree in 2005 from the School of Architecture. Her doctoral research: An aesthetic approach to the soundscape of urban public open spaces formed part of the EU-funded RUROS project (Rediscovering the Urban Realm and Open Spaces).

== Career ==
In 2004, while completing her PhD, Yang joined David Lock Associates in Milton Keynes. In 2011, she founded Wei Yang & Partners in London, a practice specialising in integrated master planning and knowledge exchange between research and practice.

In 2011, Yang initiated self-funded research on the 21st Century Garden City, adapting the principles of the original Garden City movement to contemporary challenges and opportunities such as climate change, an aging society, and technological innovation.

Her work, undertaken in response to emerging needs in the field, preceded the UK Government’s 2014 Garden City proposals. The research had led to the success of Wei Yang & Partners in winning the Wolfson Economics Finalist Prize in 2014. The competition final report, New Garden Cities: Visionary, Economically Viable and Popular was cited in The Lyons Housing Review: Mobilising Across the Nation to Build the Homes our Children Need. In the field of practical work, Wei Yang & Partners have delivered many master planning projects in the UK and China utilising 21st Century Garden City approach.

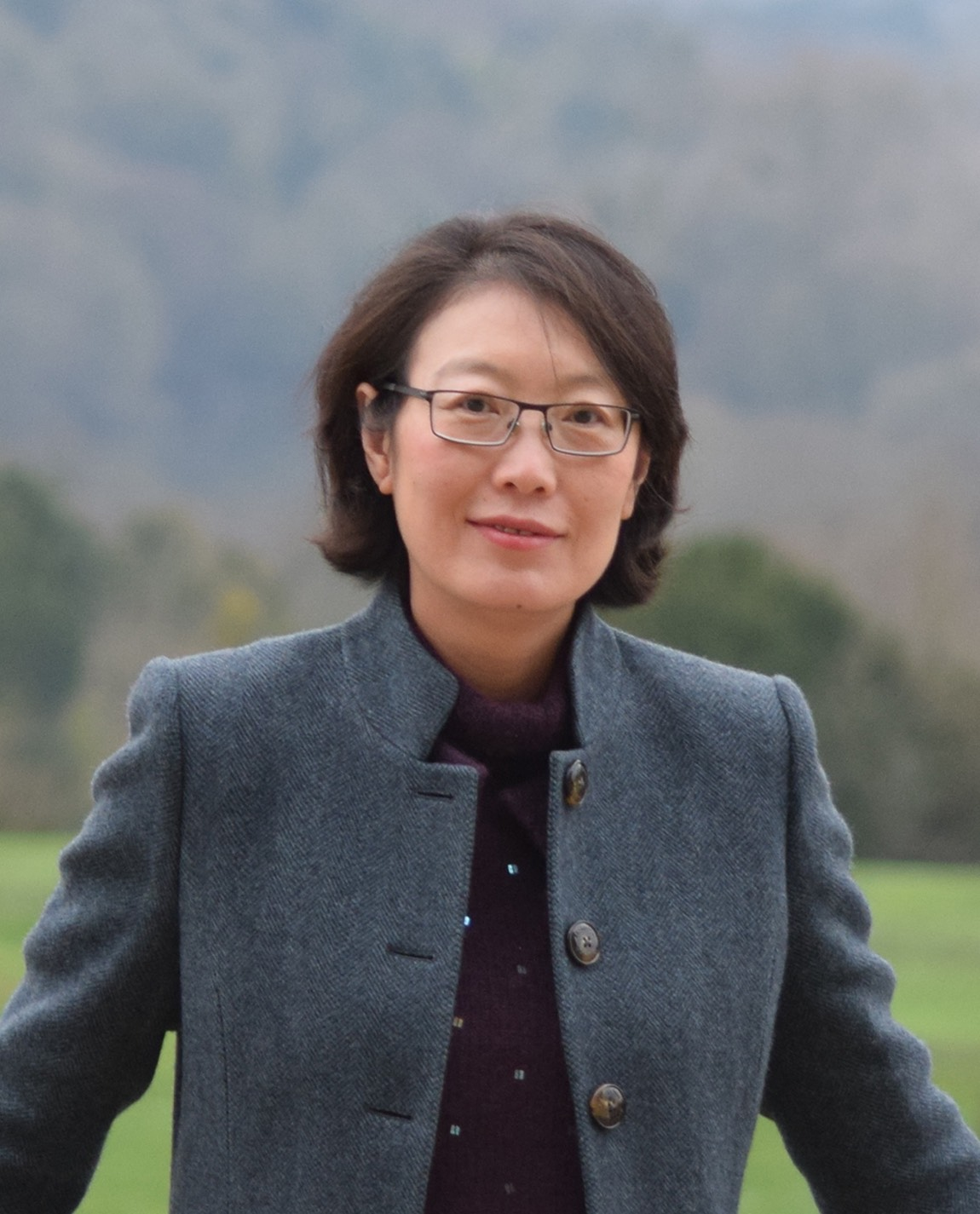
Wei Yang

Yang is also a key figure in promoting green & low-carbon development approach in China. From 2013 to 2016, she co-chaired the UK-China Eco-Cities & Green Building Group. Between 2013 and 2014, she was seconded by the UK Foreign and Commonwealth Office (FCO) as British Principal Planning Expert to advise the Chinese Ministry of Housing & Urban-Rural Development (MoHURD) on sustainable urbanisation. She also gave expert advice to Progressing Eco-City Policies into Mainstream Practice in China project in 2012, and ‘the Europe-China Eco-Cities Link (EC-Link)’ project in 2013. From 2015 to 2017, she led the UK-China pilot project on ‘the Green & Low-Carbon Development of Small Towns in China’, and was lead author of The Technical Manual for Green & Low-Carbon Development of Small Towns in China.

In 2014, Yang was elected as a World Cities Summit Young Leader by Singapore, and was named as the Planner's Women of Influence in 2017, 2018.

In 2017, recognising her innovative work and actions in promoting joined up thinking between different built environment professionals, she was conferred as a Fellow of Academy of Social Sciences (AcSS). In 2018, she was conferred as a Fellow of the Royal Town Planning Institute (RTPI). In May 2019, she was appointed as a board member of the British Library by the Secretary of State for Digital, Culture, Media & Sport.

In September 2019, Yang was elected by RTPI members as vice president for 2020. In her Manifesto, she stated that ‘I want to champion a revival of spirit for our profession by enhancing public appreciation, strengthening international collaboration on capacity building, and contributing to immediate actions on the climate and biodiversity emergency. I am also keen to do more to engage young planners and adopt new technologies to empower the modernisation.’

In August 2020, several suggestions Yang made to the Chinese Ministry of Natural Resources was adopted in their consultation paper - Planning Guidance for Metropolitan Areas (August 2020) including: 'A strategic and long-term urban-rural integrated approach; A single digital base map containing all-natural, ecological, socio-economic, demographic, cultural & heritage, infrastructure, pollution, agricultural, climate change impact, and hazards information; An emphasis on the public service purpose of planning and strengthening public engagement; Urban design and place-making to be embedded in the whole plan-making process; Integration of a blue & green landscape framework in urban developments, bringing the beauty of nature into cities, developing distinctive local characters; Creating pedestrian friendly walkable neighbourhoods, and human-scale public open spaces.'

Yang was inaugurated as RTPI President on 20 January 2021. In her Presidential Inaugural Address, Yang said ‘The fundamental objective of the planning profession is to create a balanced system for People, Nature and Society to co-exist in harmony’; ‘I believe compassion and selflessness are the moral foundations of our profession’; 'We need a reimagining of planning, thinking beyond professional boundaries and the present day'.

Yang formed Digital Task Force for Planning in early 2021 with Professor Michael Batty, Chairman of Centre for Advanced Spatial Analysis, University College London. The mission of the Task Force is to promote an integrated digitally informed approach to Town & Country Planning. The Task Force examined 'how the planning profession and its education can embrace the digital revolution in a more thorough and proactive way to empower planners with new skills to tackle the grand challenges of our times for public interest'.

The Task Force Report, A Digital Future for Planning – Spatial Planning Reimagined (Batty & Yang, 2022) outlined blueprint for digital transformation of spatial planning and the sector's future. Keen for a shift to a ‘whole systems’ approach to tackle the grand challenges, the report put digitally enabled spatial planning at the forefront. Emphasis is placed on planners' leadership and collaboration with like-minded professionals across the built and natural environment sectors to achieve common goals. The report has garnered global attention, attracting readers from over 125 countries.

Leading the modernisation and digital transformation of the planning profession, Yang developed a new digitally-enabled integrated methodology for spatial planning, which she presented in her Abercrombie Lecture, Spatial Planning Reimagined: Rekindling the Founding Spirit for the Future.

Yang co-authored Humanistic Pure Land and Garden Cities (2021) with Venerable Ru Chuang, Director of Fo Guang Shan Buddha Museum during 2020 COVID19 lockdown. Venerable Ru Chuang wrote Humanistic Pure Land; Yang wrote Garden Cities. The book revealed the moral connections between the philosophies of Garden Cities and Humanistic Buddhism. The book became Taiwan best seller number one after its publication in November 2021. The income of the book was donated to Fo Guang Shan Education Foundation to fund education for children from disadvantaged background.

In June 2023, Yang was elected as the first female Chair of the Construction Industry Council (CIC) and the first Chair born outside the UK and Ireland.

In December 2023, Yang was one of four expert advisers commissioned by the Secretary of State for the Department for Levelling Up, Housing and Communities to provide an independent report titled Housebuilding in London: London Plan Review – Report of Expert Advisers.

In September 2024, Yang was appointed to the UK Government's New Towns Taskforce, an independent expert advisory panel established to support the government in delivering the next generation of new towns. Yang was the only planner on the Taskforce. The New Towns Taskforce: Report to Government was published on 28 September 2025 and includes recommendations on the vision, potential locations, placemaking principles, digital innovation, delivery, and financing of new towns.

In January 2025, Yang launched Digital Planning Directory. It was recognised by the UK Ministry of Housing, Communities and Local Government as "a milestone moment for the UK’s planning sector".

Yang is an honorary professor at University College London and a member of UN Habitat World Urban Campaign Steering Committee.

== Current affiliations ==
- CEO, Digital Task Force for Planning
- Chairman, Wei Yang & Partners
- Honorary Professor, University College London
- Board Member and Chair of the Capital Portfolio Committee, the British Library
- Past Chair, Construction Industry Council
- Past President, the Royal Town Planning Institute

== Memberships and fellowships ==
- Fellow of the Academy of Social Sciences (AcSS), elected in 2017
- Fellow of the Royal Town Planning Institute (RTPI), elected in 2018 (Member of RTPI since 2012)
- Member of the Chartered Institution of Highways and Transportation (CIHT), elected in 2009

== Past roles ==
- CABE Enabler (2009–2011)
- Member of the Editorial Advisory Panel of the Proceedings of the Institution of Civil Engineers: Urban Design and Planning (2011–2014)
- Co-chair of the UK-China Eco-Cities & Green Building Group (2013–2016)
- President of the Royal Town Planning Institute (2021)
- Board Trustee, the Landscape Institute (2018-2022)
- Board Trustee, Milton Keynes City Discovery Centre (2010-2022)
