= Contingency allowance =

The contingency allowance is the time allocated during planning for unscheduled events. Technical and personal disruptions result in changes in the indirect production costs. The contingency allowance is calculated in special contingency time studies, the results of which yield rates for indirect production costs. The time is usually added to the pure operations time to form a standard time in manufacturing.

The concept was developed by Charles Bedaux.
