= Lyons Housing Review =

The Lyons Housing Review was a UK public policy review on Housing initiated by the Labour Party Leader (and then Leader of Opposition) Ed Miliband. Ed Miliband announced the creation of the Housing Commission at Labour Party Conference 2013 and appointed Sir Michael Lyons to lead. Sir Michael Lyons reported on 16 October 2014, the full report is here.

== Key Areas for focus ==
Civic Voice in a call for contributions at the start of the commission summarised the initial parameters of the review thus

Sir Michael Lyons has identified a number of key areas on which he would like to focus:

1. The land Market
2. Investment in housing and infrastructure
3. The role of a new generation of New Towns and Garden Cities
4. Co-operation between adjoining local authorities in the planning process.
5. Sharing the benefit of development with local communities.

== Findings ==
The executive summary gives the main findings

- The UK needs to build 243,000 homes a year due to household formation but builds 100,000 short of this. The cumulative shortfall is set to increase to two million by 2020.
- The shortfall is caused firstly by a scarcity of land coming to market.
- and secondly by a decline in housebuilder firms particularly small and medium size enterprises (SME)
- and thirdly by a decline in public sector house-building, housing associations building on average 18,000 home per year whilst local authorities averaged 90,000 per year after WWII.

The executive summary then goes on to give a roadmap for action including

- Elevate Ministerial Responsibility so that the Prime Minister and the Cabinet are held accountable
- Set ambition to build 200,000 homes a year
- Sub-targets to be set at the local authority level
- Establish a cross government departmental task force
- Legislation for Garden Cities, Compulsory Purchase Orders, land taxation
- The creation of New Homes Corporations and infrastructure funds
- Set targets for the release of surplus public land
- Promote transparency of the Land Registry to register not just ownership but also register options to buy land
- Legislation for a speeded-up planning process and new government powers to force local councils to produce and follow housebuilding plans
- Initial restriction of sale of houses to non local residents
- 'Use it or lose it' to penalise land hoarding
- Cutting planning permission from 3 years to 2 years.

== Reaction ==
=== Political parties ===
On publication the governing Conservative Party's Local Government secretary, Eric Pickles, said "The small print of Labour’s housing policies reveals they want to impose top-down planning, with unelected officials in Whitehall ripping up the Green Belt and dumping rebranded eco-towns on local communities." A charge denied by Roberta Blackman-Woods, Labour's then shadow planning minister.

=== The National Press ===
The Conservative supporting The Daily Telegraph reported on the Green Belt proposals alone whilst The Guardian reported Housing industry welcomes 180-page review calling for 200,000 new homes to be built each year.

== Other Housing Reviews ==
The Lyons Housing review is (as of 2017) the fourth UK Housing Review since 2004. They are Barker 2004, Callcutt 2007, Lyons 2014, Redfern 2016.
