= Johnsen–Rahbek effect =

The Johnsen–Rahbek effect occurs when an electric potential is applied across the boundary between a metallic surface and the surface of a semiconducting material or a polyelectrolyte. Under these conditions an attractive force appears, whose magnitude depends on the voltage and the specific materials involved. The attractive force is much larger than would be produced by Coulombic attraction.

The effect is named after Danish engineers F. A. Johnsen and K. Rahbek, the first to investigate the effect at length.
