= Institute of Workplace and Facilities Management =

UK professional association

- Abbreviation: IWFM
- Predecessor: British Institute of Facilities Management (BIFM)
- Formation: 1993
- Type: Professional association
- Purpose: Facilities management and workplace management
- Headquarters: United Kingdom
- Region served: United Kingdom
- Official language: English
- Key people: Andrew Hulbert (chair), Linda Hausmanis (CEO)
- Website: www.iwfm.org.uk

The Institute of Workplace and Facilities Management (IWFM; formerly the British Institute of Facilities Management, BIFM) is a professional association for workplace and facilities management (FM) professionals in the United Kingdom. It supports practitioners, organisations and the wider built environment sector through standards, qualifications, research and policy activity. IWFM aims to strengthen the workplace management and FM professions by promoting best practice and developing professional capabilities.

== History ==
BIFM was formed in 1993 to promote the development of FM as a critical, professional and strategic business discipline. In June 2018, the BIFM had around 17,000 individual members.

BIFM was a founding member of the Global Facility Management Association (Global FM), and a full member of the Construction Industry Council.

The institute grew alongside rising demand for qualified FM professionals, providing structured learning pathways and recognised competence standards.

In May 2018, the BIFM proposed changing its name to the Institute of Workplace and Facilities Management and attaining chartered body status. The name change was implemented in November 2018.

This change responded to the profession’s evolution and the increasing importance of workplace strategy, employee experience and organisational performance. The new name signalled a stronger focus on the relationship between people, place and productivity within modern workplaces.

== See also ==
- List of professional associations in the United Kingdom
