= Construction Industry Council (United Kingdom) =

UK forum for construction professional associations

- Company type: Private company limited by guarantee
- Founded: 1988
- Headquarters: The Building Centre, London, United Kingdom
- Key people: Dr Wei Yang (Chairman); Graham Watts (CEO)
- Website: www.cic.org.uk

Construction Industry Council (CIC) is the representative forum for professional bodies, research organisations and specialist business associations in the United Kingdom construction industry.

== History ==
The first proposals for a Building Industry Council were made in 1985 (backed by the Chartered Institute of Building, Chartered Institution of Building Services Engineers and the Institution of Structural Engineers) but came to nothing. A further attempt followed in 1987 with support from the Royal Institute of British Architects, and the BIC was publicly launched on 16 September 1987. However, it was more than a year before a first meeting, including the Royal Institution of Chartered Surveyors, took place on 1 November 1988. The body was incorporated in May 1999, and with the Institution of Civil Engineers then a member, changed its name to the Construction Industry Council in April 1990.

== Activities ==
CIC provides a single voice for professionals across the built environment through its collective membership of 500,000 individual professionals and more than 25,000 firms of construction consultants. The breadth and depth of its membership means that CIC (like a small number of other bodies, including Constructing Excellence) can speak with authority on issues connected with construction without being constrained by the self-interest of any particular sector of the industry.

As representative of the views of professionals, it has a seat on the government/industry body, the Strategic Forum for Construction.

Construction Industry Council developed and operates the Design Quality Indicator (DQI) tool to measure the design quality of buildings.

From 2014, CICAIR Limited, a specially created wholly owned subsidiary of CIC, was the sole body authorised to approve Approved Inspectors to undertake building control work in England and Wales. In 2024, responsibility for Approved Inspectors (and Registered Building Control Approvers) was transferred to the Health and Safety Executive; CIC staff working for CICAIR transferred to the HSE.

== Organisation ==
Construction Industry Council's work is managed on a day-to day basis by a small secretariat which works under the direction of the Chief Executive who is responsible to the Council. The Board acts as the main policy and strategy vehicle of the Council.

=== Chair ===
Chairs of the Building or Construction Industry Council and their terms of office:

- Sir Edmund Happold: 1988–1991
- Sir Ian Dixon: 1991–1994
- Robin Wilson: 1994–1996
- Christopher Vickers: 1996–1998
- Robin Nicholson: 1998–2000
- Michael Dickson: 2000–2002
- Turlogh O'Brien: 2002–2004
- Stuart Henderson: 2004–2006
- Nick Raynsford MP: 2006–2008
- Keith Clarke: 2008–2010
- Gordon Masterton: 2010–2012
- Jack Pringle: 2012–2014
- Tony Burton: 2014–2016
- John Nolan: 2016–2018
- Stephen Hodder: 2019–2021
- Justin Sullivan: 2021–2023
- Dr Wei Yang: 2023–2025

In June 2023, Dr Wei Yang became CIC's first female chair. A town planner and past president of the Royal Town Planning Institute, her appointment also put women in the majority on the CIC board.

== Membership ==
The Construction Industry Council has three categories of membership: Full; Associate; and Honorary Affiliate Members.

Full members, as of February 2022, are:

- Association of Consultant Approved Inspectors
- Association for Consultancy and Engineering
- Association for Project Management
- Association for Project Safety
- Association for Specialist Fire Protection
- British Approvals for Fire Equipment
- British Institute of Interior Design
- Building Research Establishment
- Building Services Research and Information Association
- Chartered Association of Building Engineers
- Chartered Institute of Architectural Technologists
- Chartered Institute of Building
- Chartered Institute of Plumbing and Heating Engineering
- Chartered Institute of Procurement & Supply
- Chartered Institution of Building Services Engineers
- Chartered Institution of Civil Engineering Surveyors
- Chartered Institution of Highways and Transportation
- Construction Industry Research and Information Association
- Ground Forum
- Institute of Clerks of Works and Construction Inspectorate
- Institute of Workplace and Facilities Management
- Institution of Engineering and Technology - Built Environment Panel
- Institution of Fire Engineers
- Institution of Specialist Surveyors and Engineers
- Institution of Structural Engineers
- International Institute of Risk and Safety Management
- Local Authority Building Control
- Landscape Institute
- National House Building Council
- Royal Institute of British Architects
- Royal Institution of Chartered Surveyors
- Royal Town Planning Institute
- Safety Assessment Federation
