= Building services engineering =

Professional engineering discipline

Building services engineering (BSE), building services, service engineering or facilities and services planning engineering is a professional engineering discipline that strives to achieve a safe and comfortable indoor environment while minimizing the environmental impact of a building. It is a component of facilities management, and plays a part in the operation and management of physical infrastructure in the built environment.

Building services engineering can be considered a subdiscipline of utility engineering, supply engineering and architectural engineering (building engineering), which are all subsets of civil engineering.

Building services engineering encompasses the professional disciplines mechanical, electrical and plumbing (MEP), and technical building services, specifically the fields of

- HVAC and building related sanitary engineering
- electrical engineering including building automation and building related telecommunications engineering
- mechanical engineering insofar it is building related, e.g. in the construction of elevators

Building services engineering is related to facilities engineering which focusses on the technical facilities of commercial and industrial buildings; and both are part of the larger field of facilities management that is made up of both engineering and non-engineering sub-disciplines.

== Professional bodies ==
The two most notable professional bodies are:

- The American Society of Heating, Refrigerating and Air-Conditioning Engineers (ASHRAE) was founded in 1894.
- The British Chartered Institution of Building Services Engineers (CIBSE) was founded in 1976 and received a Royal Charter in the United Kingdom, formally recognising building services engineering as a profession.

== Education ==
Building services engineers typically possess an academic degree in civil engineering, architectural engineering, building services engineering, mechanical engineering or electrical engineering. The length of study for such a degree is usually 3–4 years for a Bachelor of Engineering (BEng) or Bachelor of Science (BSc) and 4–5 years for a Master of Engineering (MEng).

In the United Kingdom, the Chartered Institution of Building Services Engineers (CIBSE) accredits university degrees in Building Services Engineering. In the United States, ABET accredits degrees.

== Building services engineering software ==
Many tasks in building services engineering involve the use of engineering software, for example to design/model or draw solutions. The most common types of tool are whole building energy simulation and CAD (traditionally 2D) or the increasingly popular Building Information Modeling (BIM) which is 3D. 3D BIM software can have integrated tools for Building Services calculations such sizing ventilation ducts or estimating noise levels. Another use of 3D/4D BIM is that empowers more informed decision making and better coordination between different disciplines, such as 'collision testing'.

== See also ==
- American Society of Heating, Refrigerating and Air-Conditioning Engineers
- Architectural engineering
- Building engineer
- Building Engineering Services Association
