= Chartered Institution of Building Services Engineers =

Engineering association based in London

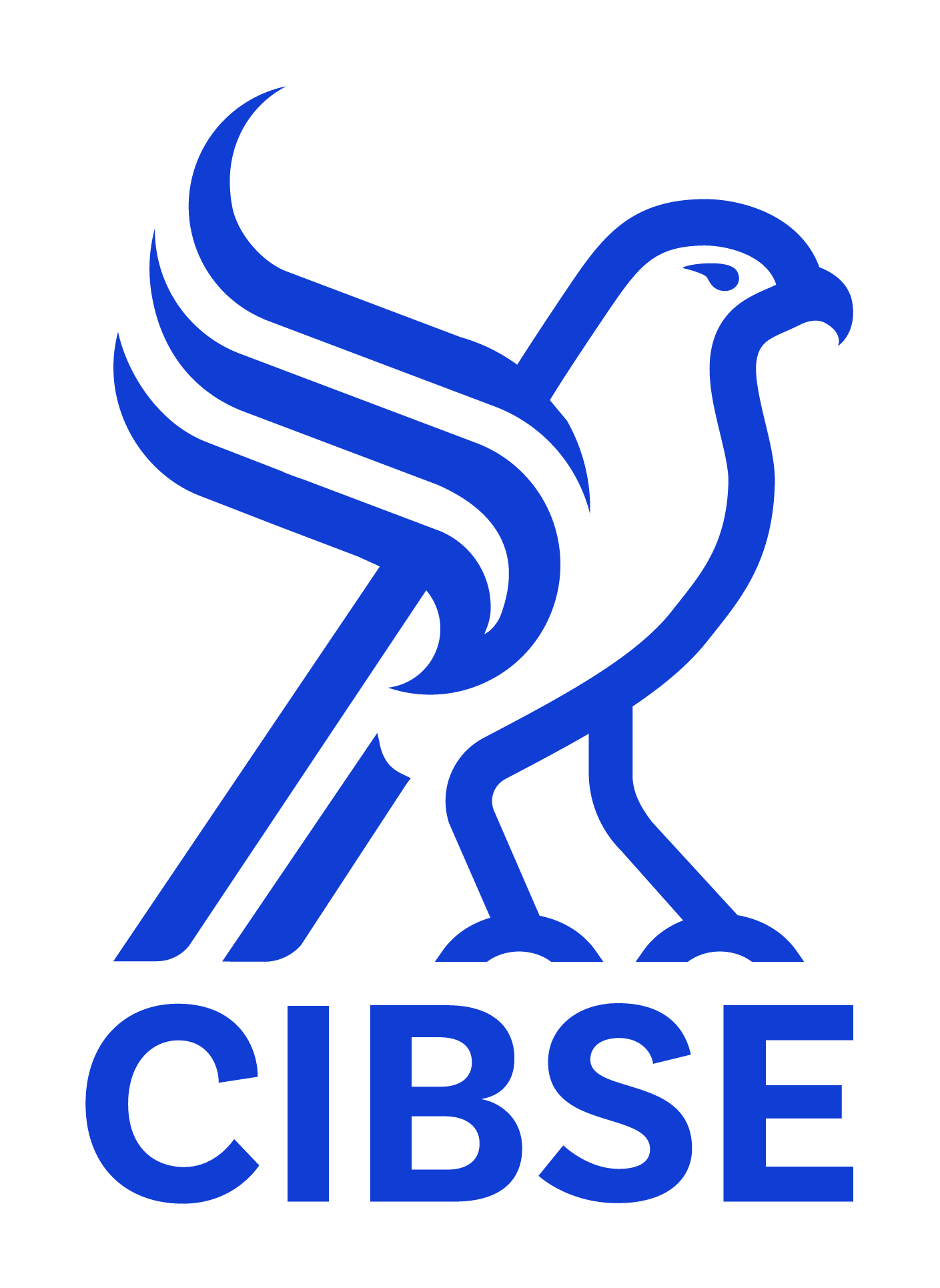
- Formation: 1976
- Merger of: Institution of Heating and Ventilating Engineers; Illuminating Engineering Society
- Type: Building services engineering; professional engineering institutions
- Professional title: Chartered Building Services Engineer
- Headquarters: London, England
- Region served: Worldwide
- Services: Professional accreditation; Publications; Training; Award and bursaries; Conferences and events
- Members: approximately 23,000
- Website: www.cibse.org

The Chartered Institution of Building Services Engineers (CIBSE; pronounced 'sib-see') is an international engineering institution representing building services professionals. The institution provides standards, guidance, and professional development related to sustainability, innovation, and building performance within the built environment. Its activities include work on decarbonisation, building performance, and continuing professional development, supporting professionals involved in the delivery of safe and efficient buildings.

CIBSE is based in London, England, it is a full member of the Construction Industry Council, and is consulted by government on matters relating to construction, engineering and sustainability. The institution is licensed by the Engineering Council to assess candidates for professional registration as Chartered Engineers (CEng), Incorporated Engineers (IEng) and Engineering Technicians (EngTech). As of 2024, CIBSE has approximately 23,000 members across 95 countries worldwide.

== History ==
CIBSE has its origins in the late Victorian period, when technical approaches to heating, ventilation and lighting were becoming increasingly important in building design. The Institution of Heating and Ventilating Engineers was founded in 1897, followed by the Illuminating Engineering Society in 1909.

In 1976, the two institutions were amalgamated by Royal Charter to form the Chartered Institution of Building Services. The word “Engineers” was added to the organisation’s name in 1985, creating its current title. The institution’s coat of arms was granted by the College of Arms in 1979.

== Royal Charter and governance ==
Under its Royal Charter and By-laws, CIBSE’s primary objectives are the promotion, for the benefit of the public, of the art, science and practice of building services engineering, and the advancement of education and research in the discipline, including the publication of the results of such research.

CIBSE Regulations, which are informed by the Royal Charter and By-laws, govern matters relating to membership, governance, professional conduct, and the organisation of regions and divisions.

== Membership ==
CIBSE offers eight grades of membership. The upper four grades confer post-nominal letters: Fellow (FCIBSE), Member (MCIBSE), Associate (ACIBSE) and Licentiate (LCIBSE). The remaining grades are Graduate, Full-time Student, Part-time Student and Apprentice, and Affiliate.

Members assessed by CIBSE for professional registration may be registered with the CEng, IEng or EngTech. Professional registration indicates that individuals have met nationally and internationally recognised standards of competence and professional commitment.

== Structure and organisation ==
=== Societies ===
Five specialist societies operate within CIBSE, reflecting specific areas of expertise within building services engineering.

- The Society of Digital Engineering (SDE) was established to provide a professional community for individuals involved in digitising the built environment. This includes designers, contractors, manufacturers, clients, facility managers, and software vendors who apply digital tools and methodologies to improve building performance and operations.
- The Society of Facade Engineering (SFE) was formed in 2004 with the support of the Institution of Structural Engineers (IStructE) and the Royal Institute of British Architects (RIBA). Its objective is to advance knowledge, best practices, and professional standards in facade engineering, addressing the design, construction, and performance of building envelopes.
- The Society of Light and Lighting (SLL) serves as the professional body for lighting in the United Kingdom. It represents professionals involved in the art, science, and engineering of light and lighting, with over 3,000 members worldwide. SLL was originally founded in 1909 as the London-based Illuminating Engineering Society (not to be confused with the Illuminating Engineering Society in New York).
- The Society of Public Health Engineers (SoPHE) provides focus and support for public health engineers within CIBSE. It promotes professional development and best practices in the design, maintenance, and operation of water, drainage, and public health systems in buildings.
- The Society of Vertical Transportation (SoVT) is the professional home for those involved in lifts, escalators, and other vertical mobility systems. SoVT serves a global community, including individuals engaged in the design, engineering, installation, maintenance, and innovation of vertical transportation, supporting knowledge exchange and professional development in this specialised field.

=== Special interest groups ===
CIBSE operates a range of special interest groups that are open to both members and non-members. These groups cover specialised technical and professional topics in building services engineering, including ASHRAE standards, building simulation, data centres, day lighting, education buildings, electrical services, energy performance, facilities management, healthcare, heat networks, heritage and retrofit, homes for the future, HVAC systems, information technology and controls, intelligent buildings, natural ventilation, resilient cities, and sustainability.

=== Regional network ===
CIBSE operates through a network of 20 volunteer-led regions covering the United Kingdom, Ireland, Australia and New Zealand, Hong Kong, and the Middle East and North Africa. The regions seek to connect, inform, and inspire members and the wider communities in which they work and live. They organise local events, professional activities, and networking opportunities for building services engineers.

The regions include Australia & New Zealand, East Anglia, East Midlands, Home Counties (North East, North West, South East, South West), Hong Kong, Ireland, MENA, Merseyside and North Wales, Northern Ireland, Scotland, South Wales, Southern, West Midlands, and Yorkshire.

=== Networks and patrons ===
CIBSE supports professional networks including the Young Engineers Network (YEN), Women in Building Services Engineering (WiBSE) and the Fellows Network, which provide opportunities for professional development and mentoring.

CIBSE Patrons are businesses that provide financial and technical support to initiatives led by the institution, with a focus on education and early-career development.

== Certification ==
Following the introduction of Part L (Conservation of Fuel and Power) of the UK Building Regulations in 2006, CIBSE established the Low Carbon Consultants Register (LCC) to ensure a body of competent and trained professionals was available to implement regulatory requirements, including calculations demonstrating reductions in building carbon emissions both in design and operation.

CIBSE also offers accreditation as a Low Carbon Energy Assessor (LCEA), enabling accredited professionals to produce Energy Performance Certificates (EPCs) and Display Energy Certificates (DECs) in accordance with the Energy Performance in Buildings Regulations. Only accredited assessors who are members of an approved scheme, such as the LCEA Register, can issue these certificates. Assessors must regularly update their training to maintain high standards of competency.

The LCC scheme has been expanded to include Low Carbon Consultants in Energy Management Systems, ensuring consultants have the competencies to assist organisations in implementing standards such as BS EN 16001.

CIBSE also provides certification for Air Conditioning Inspectors in accordance with the Energy Performance of Buildings Certificates and Inspections Regulations 2007 for England and Wales. The institution delivers training and continuing professional development programmes, including courses, conferences, and online learning covering topics such as fire safety, mechanical and electrical services, facilities management, and professional practice.

== Training ==
Many training options are available through CIBSE, with the aim of providing specialised courses, conferences and seminars for those within the building services industry. and the provision of Continuing Professional Development (CPD) training, to improve and enhance the skills required to be engineering professional. Included are a range of courses from fire safety and mechanical and electrical services courses, to facilities management and business skills-focused training. Online modules can also be completed which can be used to contribute towards the Edexcel Advanced Professional Diploma in Building Services Engineering.

== Publications ==
CIBSE publishes a series of technical guides that provide recommended design criteria and standards for building services engineering. Several of these guides are cited within UK building regulations and are used as accepted means of demonstrating regulatory compliance.

The main guides address areas including Guide A on environmental design, Guide B on heating, ventilating, air conditioning and refrigeration, Guide C on reference data, Guide D on transportation systems in buildings, Guide E on fire safety engineering, Guide F on energy efficiency in buildings, Guide G on public health and plumbing engineering, Guide H on building control systems, Guide J on weather, solar and illuminance data (now withdrawn), Guide K on electricity in buildings, Guide L on sustainability, and Guide M on maintenance engineering and management.

In 2011, CIBSE made its published guidance available to members through an online Knowledge Portal, providing access to guides, commissioning codes, applications manuals and technical memoranda.

CIBSE publishes its official magazine, CIBSE Journal, ten times per year. The institution also publishes two peer-reviewed technical journals in association with SAGE Publishing: Building Services Engineering Research & Technology and Lighting Research & Technology, both of which are indexed in major academic databases.

== See also ==
- American Society of Heating, Refrigerating and Air-Conditioning Engineers
- Building engineer
- Institution of Lighting Professionals
- Society of Engineers
- Society of Professional Engineers UK
