= Alan Penn =

British architectural researcher and academic

- Known for: Space syntax research, visibility graph analysis

Academic background
- Education: University College London (BSc, DipArch, MSc)

Academic work
- Discipline: Architecture, urban studies
- Sub-discipline: Space syntax, architectural and urban computing
- Institutions: Bartlett School of Architecture, UCL

Alan Penn is a British architectural researcher and academic known for his work on space syntax. He is Professor of Architectural and Urban Computing at the Bartlett School of Architecture, University College London (UCL). He was Dean of the Bartlett Faculty of the Built Environment from 2009 to 2019, and Chief Scientific Adviser to the Ministry of Housing, Communities and Local Government (later the Department for Levelling Up, Housing and Communities) from 2019 to 2023. His research looks at how the design of the built environment affects the social and economic behaviour of organisations and communities.

== Career ==
Penn studied architecture at UCL, graduating with a BSc in 1978 and a Diploma in Architecture in 1980, and later took an MSc there in 1983. From 1980 to 1984 he worked as an assistant architect in the architects' department of the North East Thames Regional Health Authority. He then moved to UCL's Unit for Architectural Studies on a research placement.

He taught at the Bartlett from the late 1980s and held lectureships there until 1996. He became a senior lecturer in 1996 and a reader in 1999, and was appointed Professor of Architectural and Urban Computing in 2003. From 1997 to 2007 he directed UCL's Virtual Reality Centre for the Built Environment.

He was one of the founders, with Bill Hillier and other Bartlett colleagues, of Space Syntax Limited, a consultancy set up to apply UCL's space syntax research to architectural and urban design projects. He later became chair of its board.

=== Dean of the Bartlett ===
Penn succeeded Christine Hawley as Dean of the Bartlett Faculty of the Built Environment in 2009. He served two five-year terms, the maximum UCL allows, and Christoph Lindner succeeded him in 2019. While he was dean the faculty grew from 36 to 77 degree programmes and to more than 3,000 students, and was reorganised into thirteen schools and institutes. In 2018, towards the end of his deanship, he announced the Bartlett Promise. Under the scheme a share of places would be offered with no fees and a living stipend, to attract students who could not otherwise afford to study architecture. Penn said high fees had left the intake "now mainly middle-class".

=== Government adviser ===
Penn was appointed to the part-time post of Chief Scientific Adviser to the Ministry of Housing, Communities and Local Government in July 2019. The post had been vacant since late 2013. His remit included advising the Building Safety Programme set up after the Grenfell Tower fire. In May 2020 he told the House of Commons Science and Technology Committee that he had attended about four meetings of the Scientific Advisory Group for Emergencies (SAGE) during the COVID-19 pandemic, as an observer rather than a participant. He stayed in post when the ministry became the Department for Levelling Up, Housing and Communities in September 2021, and served until March 2023. Richard Prager succeeded him.

=== Research assessment and professional service ===
Penn chaired the Architecture and the Built Environment sub-panel (sub-panel 30) for the 2008 Research Assessment Exercise. For the 2014 Research Excellence Framework he chaired the Architecture, Built Environment and Planning sub-panel (sub-panel 16). He was the founding chair of the Royal Institute of British Architects' Research and Innovation Committee, serving until 2006. In 2015 he co-chaired, with Baroness Janet Whitaker, the Design Commission's inquiry into design and behaviour in the built environment. The Design Commission is the research arm of the All-Party Parliamentary Design and Innovation Group, and Richard Rogers launched the inquiry in Parliament.

== Research ==
Penn's research has developed space syntax theory and methods, which analyse how the spatial configuration of buildings and cities relates to patterns of movement, encounter and occupation.

=== Urban movement ===
With Bill Hillier and others he co-authored "Natural movement" (1993). The paper argued that the configuration of the street network is a primary driver of pedestrian movement patterns, independent of the attractions placed in it. A 1998 paper led by Penn applied configurational analysis to vehicular as well as pedestrian movement. UCL's REF 2014 impact case study on space syntax names Penn, with Hillier and Kayvan Karimi, as leading the research. It cites both papers as underpinning the method's use in projects including the redevelopment of Trafalgar Square and Nottingham's Old Market Square.

A 2001 paper with Alasdair Turner and colleagues introduced visibility graph analysis, a method for analysing visual relationships in architectural space. His 2003 paper "Space syntax and spatial cognition" examined how configurational representations relate to people's understanding of space. Later work has covered integrating space syntax tools with geographic information systems, urban data analysis, and collective behaviour in buildings.

Space syntax methods have drawn criticism. In 2004 Carlo Ratti argued that the topological representation used in space syntax analysis gives inconsistent results for some urban layouts, and Hillier and Penn published a rejoinder.

=== Workplaces and shops ===
A 1999 paper with Jake Desyllas and Laura Vaughan found that patterns of movement and space use generated by an office's layout directly affect how often staff come into contact. Later research on workplace interaction has cited this work. In 2017 The Guardian drew on his research into how open-plan offices affect behaviour, in workplaces ranging from advertising agencies to science laboratories, in reporting complaints about noise in the new Francis Crick Institute building.

In a UCL lecture on 18 January 2011, "Who enjoys shopping in IKEA?", Penn presented observations of shoppers in an IKEA store. He argued that the store's single, disorienting route encourages impulse purchases. The lecture was widely reported, in Britain and in the United States. IKEA denied that its layouts were designed to confuse shoppers.

=== Funding ===
His research has been funded mainly by the Engineering and Physical Sciences Research Council (EPSRC). This includes a platform grant for UCL's space syntax research group (2009–2015) and the Urban Dynamics Lab, part of the EPSRC's UK Regions Digital Research Facility (2015–2021), which he led as principal investigator.

== Other roles ==
From 2007 to 2018 Penn was a director and trustee of the Shakespeare North Trust, the charity behind the Shakespeare North Playhouse in Prescot, which opened in 2022.

== Selected publications ==
- Hillier, B.; Penn, A.; Hanson, J.; Grajewski, T.; Xu, J. (1993). "Natural movement: or, configuration and attraction in urban pedestrian movement". Environment and Planning B: Planning and Design. 20 (1): 29–66. doi:10.1068/b200029.
- Penn, A.; Hillier, B.; Banister, D.; Xu, J. (1998). "Configurational modelling of urban movement networks". Environment and Planning B: Planning and Design. 25 (1): 59–84. doi:10.1068/b250059.
- Penn, A.; Desyllas, J.; Vaughan, L. (1999). "The space of innovation: interaction and communication in the work environment". Environment and Planning B: Planning and Design. 26 (2): 193–218.
- Turner, A.; Doxa, M.; O'Sullivan, D.; Penn, A. (2001). "From isovists to visibility graphs: a methodology for the analysis of architectural space". Environment and Planning B: Planning and Design. 28 (1): 103–121.
- Penn, A. (2003). "Space syntax and spatial cognition: or why the axial line?". Environment and Behavior. 35 (1): 30–65. doi:10.1177/0013916502238864.
- Pinter-Wollman, N.; Penn, A.; Theraulaz, G.; Fiore, S. M. (2018). "Interdisciplinary approaches for uncovering the impacts of architecture on collective behaviour". Philosophical Transactions of the Royal Society B. 373 (1753). 20170232. doi:10.1098/rstb.2017.0232. PMC 6030586.
- Engin, Z.; van Dijk, J.; Lan, T.; Longley, P. A.; Treleaven, P.; Batty, M.; Penn, A. (2020). "Data-driven urban management: Mapping the landscape". Journal of Urban Management. 9 (2): 140–150.
