= Space Syntax Limited =

Architectural firm

Practice information
- Partners: Tim Stonor, Prof Alan Penn, Dr Kayvan Karimi, Anna Rose, Max Martinez, Ed Parham, Yolanda Barnes
- Founded: 1989
- Location: London

Space Syntax Limited is a UK architectural and urban planning practice founded at The Bartlett, University College London in 1989. It operates worldwide. The company has pioneered a science-based and human-focused approach to the planning and design of buildings and urban places, with notable projects including the redesign of Trafalgar Square with Foster and Partners, the analysis of the London Riots, the Queen Elizabeth Olympic Park, the Foresight, Future of Cities project for the UK Government Office for Science and the Pedestrian Movement Model for the City of London.

== Mission ==
The company’s mission is to apply, develop and disseminate the Space Syntax approach. This approach uses predominantly digital technologies to study human behaviour patterns and to predict them in future plans.

== Employee Ownership ==
In 2015, the company restructured itself as an employee-owned organisation with employees owning 75% of the business.

== Open source and open access ==
Space Syntax adopts an open source approach to its software development and an open access approach to its datasets. In 2018, it launched its OpenMapping project with a spatial network model of Great Britain.
