= Muyiwa Oki =

Nigeria-born British architect

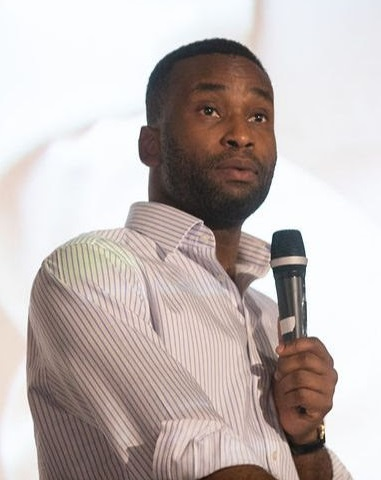
- Born: Lagos, Nigeria
- Education: University of Sheffield
- Occupation: Architect
- Employer: Mace Group
- Known for: President of the Royal Institute of British Architects (RIBA)

Muyiwa Oki is a Nigeria-born British architect who, in September 2023, took office for a two-year term as the president of the Royal Institute of British Architects (RIBA), becoming the first black president and, at 32, its youngest.

== Career ==
Born in Lagos, Nigeria, Muyiwa Oki was 11 years old when he moved to London, England. He attended school in south London and went on to study architecture at the University of Sheffield. After graduating, he worked for Glenn Howells Architects on Birmingham residential projects, then moved to London to work at Grimshaw Architects, first on the rebuild of London's Euston station to receive the HS2 high-speed railway line, then on the North London Heat and Power project in Edmonton. While at Grimshaw, he founded a multi-ethnic group and allies network.

He is currently employed by construction consultancy Mace Group. He is also an ambassador for the Mayor of London's Design Future London challenge.

== RIBA president ==
Oki's 2022 campaign to become president of the Royal Institute of British Architects (RIBA) was supported by a Just Transition Lobby movement backed by the Future Architects Front (FAF), the Section of Architectural Workers (SAW), and the institute's Future Architects Steering Group.

RIBA had been accused of institutional racism, of having a "deep, systemic disengagement from the membership", and of lacking transparency. In March 2022, young architects began a campaign to get the next RIBA president to move beyond "empty slogans and self-serving initiatives" and shake up an institute seen as "out of touch" with the wider profession. The campaign included members of FAF, and Oki was named as their preferred candidate on 6 May 2022, declaring "There needs to be a mind-shift in the architecture profession. We need to energise ourselves and create a platform where under-represented members can be heard." Days later, the RIBA announced a restriction on new members participating in the elections (starting on 28 June 2022), a rule change described by the FAF as "an outrageous lack of transparency" and "exclusionary tactics". Nonetheless, in August 2022, Oki was elected to be the next RIBA president from September 2023.

In October 2022, Oki outlined a three-point agenda, including mandating paid overtime for RIBA chartered practices, introducing quarterly "town halls" to engage RIBA members in key decisions, and prioritising the climate emergency in everything the RIBA does. In the same month, he also supported Eleni Kyriacou, who in 2021 exposed a decades-old culture of bullying at the Bartlett School of Architecture, by wearing one of her garment designs to the Stirling Prize ceremony at the RIBA.

He took office on 1 September 2023, becoming both the youngest and first black president of the RIBA, a body that had previously had only three female presidents and one non-white president (Sunand Prasad). Upon taking office, Oki said he intended to continue to press for more diversity and inclusivity within architecture, saying "a diversity of people" are needed "to solve the big issues of the day", and committed to pressing the UK government to deliver a national retrofit strategy, pledging "to be a steadfast advocate for decarbonising the built environment." He also urged architects to help deliver better UK social housing.

He returned to these themes during his presidency. For example, in December 2023, he said architects could play a 'key role' in reducing carbon emissions; in May 2024, he accused the UK Government of having no strategy to tackle overheating in UK buildings. In February 2024, after the UK Labour Party dropped its £28 billion-a-year green investment pledge, Oki warned that future generations may "pay the price". After the July 2024 general election returned a new Labour Government, Oki called for planning system reforms to put more emphasis on design quality and to avoid isolating communities. And in November 2024, following Labour's first budget, he called for "ambition and imagination" to solve the UK housing crisis.

In February 2024, the RIBA published Oki's 'Biennial Plan' setting five areas of focus to guide his presidency (employment and wellbeing; reimagining the role of architects; awareness and engagement; ensuring RIBA's sustainable growth; and developing a high-performing organisation). In October 2024, half way through his RIBA presidency, Oki talked of a forthcoming rebrand of the RIBA - eventually launched in October 2025.

In July 2025, Oki was awarded an honorary degree of Doctor of Science by Lancaster University.

In August 2025, as Oki's presidential term neared its end, he said his presidency had been about broadening conversations, from workplace wellbeing (in July 2025, he launched a taskforce to address pay, long hours and poor conditions across the profession) and digital innovation, to public engagement and the value of reuse. While acknowledging the symbolic weight of being the first salaried architect, the first black architect and the youngest to be elected RIBA president, he said his key task had been to get RIBA championing work that improved everyday life, supported inclusion and accessibility, and demonstrated architecture's social value, adding: "Hopefully I will be remembered for being the 'social justice president'".
