= Tim Stonor =

British architect and urban planner (born 1968)

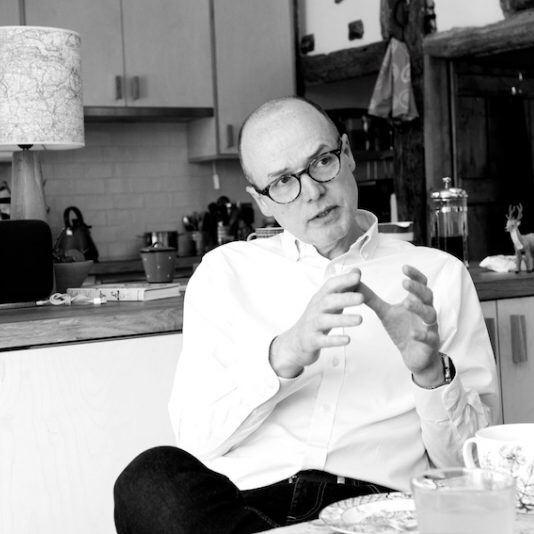
- Tim Stonor
- Born: 13 February 1968 (age 58)
- Occupations: British Architect and Urban Planner

Tim Stonor is a British architect and urban planner who graduated from The Bartlett, University College London and established the architectural consulting company Space Syntax Limited. A winner of the Loeb Fellowship at Harvard University, he is the Deputy Chair of the Design Council and a director of The Academy of Urbanism.

Born in 1968 in Newcastle upon Tyne, Stonor attended St Cuthbert's High School before moving to London to study architecture at The Bartlett, University College London. He graduated in 1989 with a BSc in Architecture and moved to Toronto, where he worked in the architectural office Adamson Associates. Here, he helped detail the design of One Canada Square, which at the time was the tallest building in the UK. He also worked on the detailed design of the retail centre adjacent to the tower.

Stonor returned to London in 1990 to study a master's degree in space syntax with Prof Bill Hillier and Prof Julienne Hanson. He graduated with distinction with an MSc in Architecture. Soon afterwards he joined the Unit for Architectural Studies (the space syntax research group at The Bartlett) as a research associate and worked on projects including the King's Cross International Terminal and the Manchester bid for the 2000 Olympic Games.

Stonor returned to education in 1993, attending Oxford Brookes University, where he graduated with distinction with a Graduate Diploma in Architecture. In 1995 he qualified as an architect.

== Career ==
Stonor re-joined the Unit for Architectural Studies at The Bartlett, where he established the Space Syntax Laboratory as the consulting arm of the research group. He reactivated a company, Space Syntax Limited, that had been created in 1989 and grew this as a science-based and human-focused design practice.

In 1996, Stonor established an independent architecture practice, Morrison Brink Stonor with fellow Bartlett graduates Robert Morrison and Barbara Brink.

In 2010 he won a Loeb Fellowship at Harvard University, where he was also awarded a Lincoln Loeb Fellowship by the Lincoln Institute of Land Policy.

== Personal life ==
Stonor lives with his family in Faversham, Kent where he has restored a 17th-century town house. In 2018 the house was extended and adapted with a design by Morrison Brink Stonor.

He campaigns locally for improvements to the streets and public spaces of Faversham. He is a trustee of The Faversham Society and participates in the environmental improvement works of the Friends of the Westbrook and Stonebridge Pond.

== Key projects ==
- Royal Academy masterplan, 2002
- Trafalgar Square redesign 2003
- Waterloo and South Bank masterplan, 2005
- Colchester, St Botolph's Quarter masterplan, 2005
- British Museum masterplan, 2005
- Jeddah Central Urban Area masterplan, 2006
- Beijing Chaoyang Central Business District masterplan, 2009
- Darwin, City Centre masterplan, 2014

== Public and professional appointments ==
- Advisory Board, Norman Foster Foundation
- A trustee of the Faversham Society
- Freedom of the City of London, 2016
- Liveryman of The Worshipful Company of Chartered Architects, 2016
- Trustee (2015) and Deputy Chair (2018) at the Design Council
- Director at The Academy of Urbanism (2008)
- Fellow of The Royal Society of Arts (2004)

== Educational appointments ==
- Visiting Professor, The Bartlett

== Awards and honours ==
- Loeb Fellowship
- Lincoln Loeb Fellowship

== Articles ==
- "Intense relationships: measuring urban intensity", The Architectural Review, 30 April 2018

== Interviews ==
- Stockton, Nick (January 27, 2014). "There's a Science to Foot Traffic, and It Can Help Us Design Better Cities". Wired.
- "Space Syntax explores the science of human behaviour for cities, urban places and buildings", Clad Magazine, 2015 Issue 2
