= Iain Borden =

English architectural historian and urban commentator

Professor Iain Borden BA, MA, MSc, PhD, HonFRIBA, PFHEA
- Born: 1962 (age 63–64); Oxford, United Kingdom
- Citizenship: British
- Occupations: Architectural historian and theorist
- Employer: University College London
- Honours: Hon Fellow of the Royal Institute of British Architects Principal Fellow of the Higher Education Authority
- Website: https://profiles.ucl.ac.uk/7991

Iain Borden (born in Oxford in 1962) is an English architectural historian and urban commentator.

== Career ==
Educated at Magdalen College School, Oxford (MCS), Iain Borden graduated from University of Newcastle upon Tyne in 1985, and went on to complete master's degrees at UCL and University of California, Los Angeles (UCLA) and a PhD at UCL. He is an Honorary Fellow of the Royal Institute of British Architects, and a Principal Fellow of the Higher Education Academy.

His historical and theoretical interests have led to publications on, among other subjects: critical theory and architectural historical methodology (InterSections: Architectural Histories and Critical Theories, (Routledge, 2000)), the history of skateboarding as an urban practice (Skateboarding and the City: a Complete History, (Bloomsbury, 2019)), boundaries and surveillance, theorists Henri Lefebvre and Georg Simmel, film and architecture, gender and architecture, body spaces and the experience of city spaces (The Unknown City: Contesting Architecture and Social Space, (MIT Press, 2001)).

Borden has also undertaken a history of automobile driving as a spatial experience of cities, landscapes and architecture, and particularly as represented on film: Drive: Journeys through Film, Cities and Landscapes, (Reaktion, 2012). Borden's own appearances on film include the 2015 interview by the character, Philomena Cunk.

For many years Borden has been involved in skateboarding history, preservation and facility provision, including providing advice to Milton Keynes council in the early 2000s, which helped lead to the creation of the 'Buszy', often considered to be the world's first skate plaza. In London, 2013, he was involved in events around the controversial Southbank Centre plans to relocate skateboarding on its site. He supported the retention of skateboarding at the original Undercroft location and elsewhere on the Southbank, appearing in the "Save Our Southbank" and Long Live Southbank videos to this end, and playing a significant part in the proposed new skateable space underneath the nearby Hungerford Bridge.

In 2014, Borden helped English Heritage list the Rom skatepark in Hornchurch (constructed 1978), the first such skatepark in Europe to gain heritage protection, and was technical consultant for the Rom Boys: 40 Years of Rad documentary directed by Matt Harris.

Borden has written several articles in national newspapers extolling the history, virtues and benefits of skateboarding to society, and has given advice on skateboard preservation, facility design and provision to numerous city authorities, architects and skatepark manufacturers in the UK and USA. He acted as an adviser for the multi-million pound F51 facility in Folkestone, UK, the world's first multi-level skatepark (opening 2022), designed by Guy Hollaway Architects with Maverick and Cambian Action Sports for the Roger De Haan Charitable Trust. In 2018, Borden helped initiate and design a new skatepark in Crystal Palace, south London, and two years later he co-authored the Skateboard England, Skateboard GB and Sport England official Design and Development Guidance for Skateboarding, a document giving advice on design, construction and build of skateparks and skateable spaces.

Iain Borden is Vice-Dean Education (since 2015) at The Bartlett, University College London (UCL), and Professor of Architecture and Urban Culture (since 2002). From 2001 to 2009 he was Director/Head of the Bartlett School of Architecture, and from 2010 to 2015 Vice-Dean Communication.

In his own research, Borden is particularly well known for his academic studies of everyday occurrences such as car driving, skateboarding, walking and movies in relation to contemporary architecture and public spaces. His books Skateboarding and the City: a Complete History (Bloomsbury, 2019) and predecessor Skateboarding, Space and the City: Architecture and the Body, (Berg, 2001) offered an analytical and historical account of skateboarding, in part using the philosophy of Henri Lefebvre to interpret this global practice as a creative, political and urban act. His book Drive: Journeys through Film, Cities and Landscapes (Reaktion, 2012), similarly explored automobile driving as experiences of cities and urban spaces, using cinematic representations to explore different speeds, landscape and social conditions. Construct: Large Everyday Architecture (Routledge, 2026) explores bridges, tunnels, observation wheels, tower cranes and other large scale everyday architectures as symbols of urban and political conditions.

== Bibliography ==
- Architecture and the Sites of History: Interpretations of Buildings and Cities, (Butterworth, 1995). Iain Borden and David Dunster (eds.).
- Strangely Familiar: Narratives of Architecture in the City, (Routledge, 1996). Iain Borden, Jane Rendell, Joe Kerr and Alicia Pivaro (eds.).
- Gender Space Architecture: an Interdisciplinary Introduction, (Routledge, 1999). Jane Rendell, Barbara Penner and Iain Borden (eds.).
- InterSections: Architectural Histories and Critical Theories, (Routledge, 2000). Iain Borden and Jane Rendell (eds.).
- The Unknown City: Contesting Architecture and Social Space, (MIT Press, 2001). Iain Borden, Jane Rendell, Joe Kerr with Alicia Pivaro (eds.).
- Skateboarding, Space and the City: Architecture and the Body, (Berg, 2001).
- Manual: the Architecture and Office of Allford Hall Monaghan Morris, (Birkhäuser, 2003).
- The City Cultures Reader, (Routledge, revised and expanded second edition, 2003). Malcolm Miles and Tim Hall with Iain Borden (eds.).
- Bartlett Works, (August Projects, 2003). Laura Allen, Iain Borden, Peter Cook and Rachel Stevenson (eds.).
- Transculturation: Cities, Spaces and Architectures in Latin America, (Rodopi, 2005). Felipe Hernandez, Mark Millington and Iain Borden (eds.).
- Skateboarding, Space and the City: Architecture and the Body, (Shin-yo-sha, 2006). Japanese edition, translation by Miho Nakagawa, Masako Saito and Tsunehiko Yabe.
- Bartlett Designs: Speculating With Architecture, (Wiley, 2009). Laura Allen, Iain Borden, Nadia O’Hare and Neil Spiller (eds).
- Drive: Journeys through Film, Cities and Landscapes, (Reaktion, 2012).
- Forty Ways To Think About Architecture: Architectural History and Theory Today, (Wiley, 2014). Iain Borden, Murray Fraser and Barbara Penner (eds).
- The Dissertation: a Guide for Architecture Students, (Architectural Press, 2000 and 2005; Routledge, new edition 2014). Iain Borden and Katerina Rüedi.
- Skateboarding and the City: a Complete History, (Bloomsbury, 2019).
- Skateboarding and the City: a Complete History, (Japanese edition, 2024)
- “Design and Development Guidance for Skateboarding”, (Skateboard England, 2020).
- Construct: Large Everyday Architecture, (Routledge, 2026).
