= Roz Barr =

British architect

Roz Barr is a British architect and the founder and director of Roz Barr Architects in London, England. Driven by an interest in the idiosyncratic processes of making, Barr founded her architectural studio in 2010, and has since gained international recognition, working on projects in London, Scotland, Spain, and New York.

As an educator and mentor, Barr has been involved with the RIBA Validation panel for over 15 years and was Vice-President of Education at the RIBA from 2013 to 2016. She has also taught at the Architectural Association, the Bartlett School of Architecture, and the Kingston School of Art and Design and has been a visiting professor at Cornell University.

== Education and career ==
Barr studied at the Glasgow School of Art, and Manchester Metropolitan University before studying architecture and completing her education at the Bartlett, UCL, in London. Barr has worked in Hong Kong and Vancouver, and has been practising in London for 20 years. Before founding her firm, she spent nearly 10 years as an associate director with Eric Parry Architects where she led notable projects such as 23 Savile Row, London, and the Holburne Museum of Art in Bath.

== Work ==
=== Architectural and urban practice ===
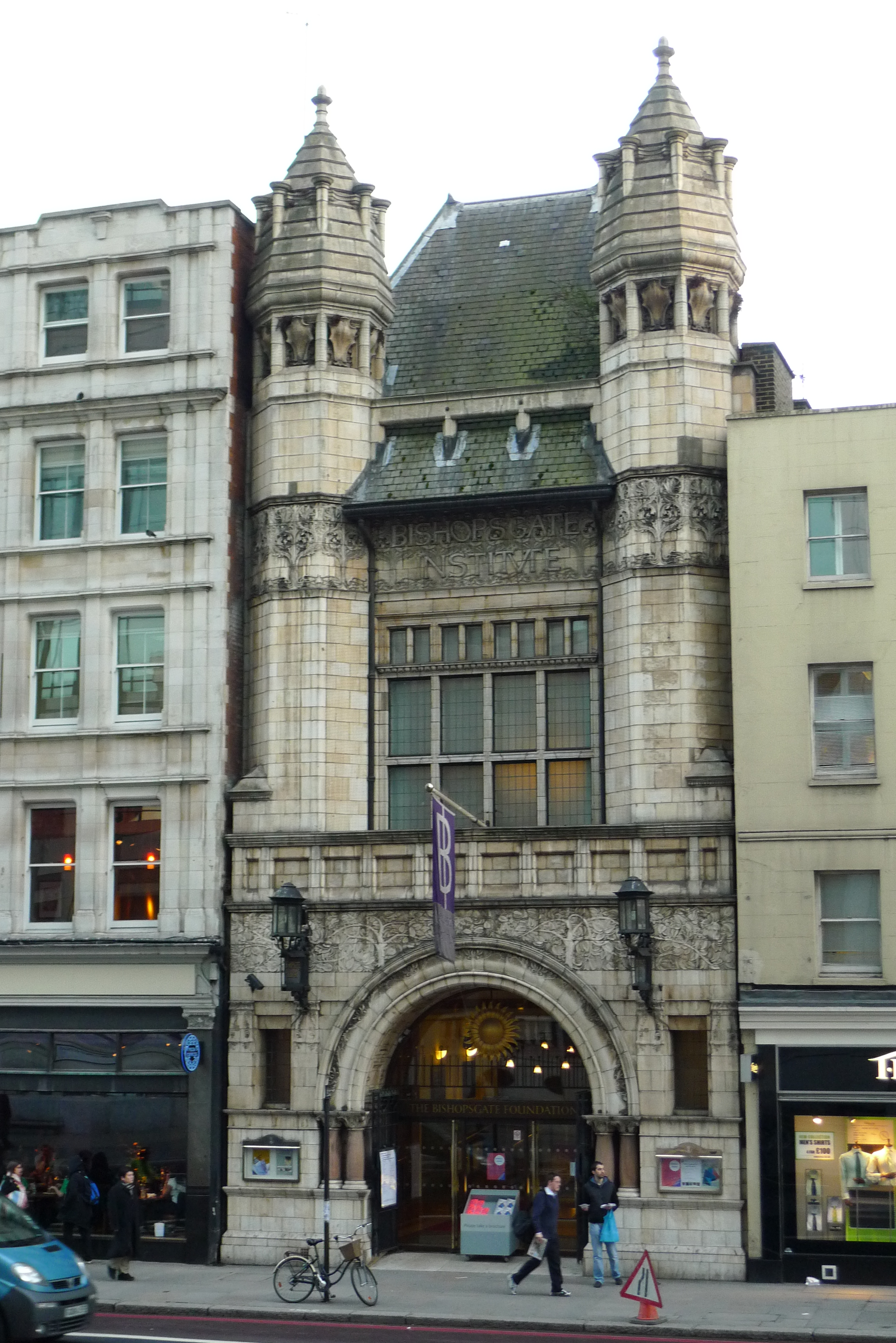
The Façade of the Bishopsgate Institute refurbished by Roz Bar Architects in London.

Roz Barr established her practice, Roz Barr Architects in 2010. The 8-strong practice has completed in projects in London, Scotland, Spain and New York. Much of their work involves restoration and refurbishment such as that of St Augustine's Church in West London, of the Goodenough Club in Bloomsbury, and of the Bishopgate Institute in the City of London. In 2019 the practice was successful in winning the international competition for the new Fashion Galleries at the V+A Museum, London, and in 2020, was selected to design two buildings within the new development called the Design District in London joining 8 other eminent international architectural practices.

The firm operates with a commitment to finding architectural solutions through a process of making and is known for its use of maquettes in designing and for its model-based representation. An in-house workshop allows the studio to create these hand-crafted models and explore other three dimensional material throughout their design process.

=== Other Involvements ===
Barr has taught at the Architectural Association, the Bartlett School of Architecture, UCL, London, and the Kingston School of Art and Design where she currently chairs a masters unit that she formed in 2019.

Her former role as Vice-President of Education at the RIBA (2013–2016) follows her involvement with promoting education and how architecture and design is taught. Her experience as a young female architect means she is a champion of diversity and equity within further education, and has been involved with the RIBA Validation panel for over 15 years, gaining insight into how architectural education is taught globally. As well as chairing exploratory panels in the UK she has led visits to Colombia, Sri Lanka, Beirut, Azerbaijan and Argentina.

== Projects ==
- Design District Bureau Club, London (2022)
- House in a Terrace, London (2022)
- V&A Fashion Galleries, London (2020)
- Bishopsgate Institute, London (2018)
- St Augustine's Church, London (2018)
- New Våler Church, Våler (2012)

== Lectures and Seminars and Exhibitions ==
- 2022 – "Sacred Space" (lecture, Cornell University Rome Visiting School, Rome, 1 November 2022)
- 2022 – "Shaping Space" (exhibition and public programme, the Building Centre, 24 September 2021 – 5 March 2022)
- 2021 – "Celebrating women in leadership with Alessandra Lariu and Roz Barr " (online event, Design District London, 18 March 2021).
- 2021 – "Provocation 12: Why Do We Make Models?" (online event, The University of Manchester, Manchester, 12 March 2021)
- 2016 – "What is the role of sacred space in our cities?" (podcast, The Architectural Review, 15 April 2016)

== Publications ==
- Barr, Ginsburg, Machin, and Porter. (3 May 2022). Reflections on the Drawing Matter Archives. Drawing Matter.
- Roz Barr. (19 April 2022). Adaptations: A Teaching Studio at Cornell. Drawing Matter.
- Barr, Dow, Hatz, Letizia Jones, Macdonald, and Thomas. (17 December 2019). Six Architects on Their Dream Desks. Drawing Matter.
- Roz, Barr. (February 2019). Alternative Histories: Roz Barr Architects on John Freeman. Drawing Matter.
- Roz Barr. (2019). Casting Spells. Architecture Today, (294), 46–50.
- Rozz Barr. (17 April 2017). Roz Barr Architects: The Maquette. Drawing Matter.
- Roz Barr. (2017). Court Case. Architecture Today, (267), 20–28.
- Roz Barr. (October 2016). 2016 Graduates Review. Blueprint, (348), 82–110.
- Roz Barr. (February 2016). Form over Function. The Architectural Review. 14–18.
- Roz Barr. (July 2015). New Beginnings. Architecture Today. (260). 45–53.

== Awards and honours ==
- 2022 – Dezeen Award 2022 Shortlist, Design District Bureau Club
- 2019 – Presidents' Award of the National Churches Trust and Ecclesiastical Architects and Surveyors Association, St Augustine's Roman Catholic church
- 2018 – RIBA National Award, St. Augustine's Church
- 2017 – AJ Small Projects shortlist, the Building Centre
- 2016 – Schueco Excellence Award
