= Josephine Kane =

British academic and historian of architecture

Josephine Kane is a British academic and historian of architecture and the built environment. She obtained her degree in history from St Anne's College, Oxford and her PhD from The Bartlett School of Architecture.

== Publications ==
- The architecture of pleasure: British amusement parks 1900-1939 (2013). Ashgate Press.
