= Eleni Kyriacou =

Greek Cypriot fashion designer

- Born: 15 June 1980 (age 45); London, UK
- Education: Francis Holland School; The Bartlett at UCL; Central Saint Martins
- Occupations: Fashion designer, activist
- Years active: 2011-present
- Label: Eleni Kyriacou
- Website: www.elenikyriacou.com

Eleni Kyriacou (born 15 June 1980) is a Greek Cypriot fashion and costume designer who designed the costumes for the lighting of the Olympic Flame ceremony, first worn for the Rio 2016 Summer Olympics. In 2021, she also exposed a decades-old culture of bullying at the Bartlett School of Architecture in London.

== Education and career ==
Kyriacou studied architecture at The Bartlett at University College London (UCL) and textile design at Central Saint Martins (CSM). She was an apprentice of the late Alexander McQueen.

She is most notable for redesigning the costumes for the lighting of the Olympic Flame ceremony, first worn for the Rio 2016 Summer Olympics. They were worn again for the Buenos Aires 2018 Youth Olympics, the Pyeongchang 2018 Winter Olympics, the Lausanne 2020 Youth Olympics, the Tokyo 2020 Summer Olympics and the Beijing 2022 Winter Olympics.

The Hellenic Olympic Committee honoured her for her contribution to the Olympic Games on 1 November 2016.

Two costumes from the ceremony are now permanently housed in the Olympic Museum in Lausanne.

Eleni Kyriacou was profiled by Bloomberg Business as a brand that moved from London to Athens amidst the Greek financial crisis. She has participated in Paris Fashion Week three times and in the Athens Xclusive Designers Week. In October 2022, Muyiwa Oki, then president-elect of the Royal Institute of British Architects, supported Kyriacou by wearing one of her garment designs to the Stirling Prize ceremony at the RIBA.

She is also a designer for the London Sock Company.

Kyriacou launched her collection Old Lace, New Life on the grounds of the National Archaeological Museum of Athens as a moving performance on 7 June 2023.

== Bartlett bullying controversy ==
Kyriacou, who alleged being a survivor of sexist misconduct from UCL's architecture school, The Bartlett, during her studies (1998-2002), conducted an independent investigation into the school (2020–21). Her research brought forward further allegations of discrimination against the school including racism as well as sexism. The findings were published by Sarah Marsh for The Guardian on 31 May 2021.

Subsequently, on 3 June 2021, UCL announced they would launch an independent investigation into the allegations made against the school. On 22 July 2021, Architects' Journal announced that a group of former students and staff members had formed Bartlett United, and were poised to take legal action against the school. On 1 October 2021, Architects' Journal reported that UCL were searching for a new director of the Bartlett. Also in October 2021, UCL appointed an external investigator, Howlett Brown, to review culture and behaviours at the Bartlett, after more than 70 testimonies from current and former staff and students at the Bartlett were given to their own lawyers by Bartlett United.

The Howlett Brown review was completed in April 2022 and on 9 June 2022, UCL publicly apologised to current and former students and staff for a decades-old "culture of unacceptable behaviour" at the Bartlett. The 119-page Howlett Brown report identified "uncomfortable truths and several ‘open secrets’ about the BSA", citing power, protectionism, a "boys' club" culture that allowed a lack of accountability, and a fear of speaking out "woven into the fabric of the BSA for a long period of time". The report's authors heard serious allegations, some dating back the early 1990s, of staff making sexist comments and verbally attacking female students, in addition to allegedly misogynistic, discriminatory, and antisemitic behaviour. Howlett Brown urged the university to investigate allegations about BSA staff further, and recommended changes to tutor hiring and staff training, plus provision of long-term counselling and support options. BSA director Bob Sheil stepped down early as head of the school, which also suspended some staff from student-facing and administrative duties with immediate effect. Kyriacou said: "I'm glad to see they’ve finally suspended staff members. I think they should just be fired quite frankly. I think they should be named. I think their careers should end in shame. They need to reboot the whole school, which is what the report says. I hope they do it." Kyriacou later also called for compensation for those who suffered must ("UCL should look into the cases of students who were unfairly graded and see whether there is a way of awarding them their part Is") and payment of medical expenses such as the counselling fees incurred by some students.

On 30 June 2022, an open letter from 24 architectural bosses, curators and academics was published. It criticised the Bartlett's publication of the Howlett Brown review, the ensuing "blacklisting" of staff and continued "Kafkaesque" investigations, and claimed there was an online "witch hunt" targeting "decent and talented teachers". Kyriacou disagreed with the academics' description of the report as a "debacle", saying the "investigation was thorough, sensitively conducted, professional and sound. It brought to the surface and it very well assessed, alarming misconduct and patterns of behaviour that have gone on, without any accountability held, for an inexcusable length of time at UCL."
