= Adrian Forty =

Adrian Forty (born 7 March 1948, Oxford, England) is an Emeritus Professor of Architectural History at The Bartlett, the Faculty of the Built Environment at University College London. He is also the former Programme Director of the master's programme in Architectural History.

Forty's main interest is in architecture's role in societies and cultural contexts. His research includes work on the design of consumer goods; on language and architecture; and on architecture, collective memory, and forgetting. As of lately, he is concerned with the history, aesthetics, and cultural significance of concrete as a construction material.

In 2003, Forty was awarded the Sir Misha Black Award for Innovation in Design Education.

== Select list of Forty's writings ==
Adrian Forty has written the following books:

- Objects of Desire: Design and Society since 1750, London: Thames and Hudson, 1986.
- The Art of Forgetting, ed., with Susanne Küchler, Oxford: Berg, 1999.
- Words and Buildings: A Vocabulary of Modern Architecture, London: Thames and Hudson, 2000.
- Brazil's Modern Architecture, with Elisabetta Andreoli, London: Phaidon Press, 2004.
- Concrete and Culture: A Material History, London: Reaktion Books, 2012.
