= Associate Parliamentary Design and Innovation Group =

All-Party Parliamentary Design & Innovation Group (APDIG)
- Legal status: Official All-Party Parliamentary Group
- Location: London
- Website: APDIG website

The All-Party Parliamentary Design and Innovation Group (APDIG) is an official All-Party Parliamentary Group. The group exists to provide a forum for open debate between Parliament and the UK's design and innovation communities, and to communicate within Parliament the enormous potential value of design, innovation and the UK creative industries, as well as help the design community better engage with the policy process.

The APPG is composed of over 30 MPs and Peers from across the Conservative, Liberal Democrat and Labour and more parties. Its official entry on the Houses of Parliament register can be found on the APPG Register.

Its secretariat services are provided by Policy Connect, an independent, not-for-profit organisation based in London.

== Mission ==
The APDIG exists to advise government and promote debate around UK design policy, acting as a bridge between the Westminster and design communities. In supporting and promoting effective debate around design and innovation, the APDIG seeks to address three particular elements within UK design policy:

- Specific government policy measures that directly affect the design industry
- Government's wider approach to industrial policy and the use of the design industry as a tool for industrial competitiveness
- How government employs design services to improve its own operation and working

== Events ==
The APDIG holds regular seminar events within Parliament to allow policy makers and the design community to meet and share ideas. Recent events have addressed issues such as the effect of design thinking on the policy making process, government procurement of design services, recent government changes to the school curriculum and its impact on design education, amendments to copyright legislation that affect designers, and the potential for an EU-wide design policy.

The APDIG also regularly holds events outside Parliament, typically in collaboration with other leading design industry organisations. Recent partnerships have included events at the V&A, Young Foundation, Danish Embassy and the London 2012 Olympic Park.

== The Design Commission ==
The APDIG has a bespoke research arm, the Design Commission. Made up of more than 20 leading figures from across the UK creative and economic communities, its purpose is to explore, through research, how design can drive economic and social improvement, and how government and business can better understand the importance of design. The Commission holds regular research inquiries, similar in scope and approach to that of a UK Parliament select committee inquiry process.

An example of work undertaken by the commission: in 2011 the commission launched a six-month inquiry, chaired by Baroness Whitaker and Vicky Pryce, former Joint Head of the United Kingdom's Government Economic Service. The inquiry examined the UK's design education system, and produced a report, entitled 'Restarting Britain', calling for policy changes in UK education.

== Parliamentary Members ==
The All-Party Parliamentary Design and Innovation Group is made up of over 30 parliamentarians from across both Houses of Parliament and three political parties, as well as the House of Lords' cross benches.

Conservative	Liberal Democrat	Labour	Other
Gavin Williamson MP (co-chair)	Julian Huppert MP	Barry Sheerman MP (co-chair)	Baroness Howe of Idlicote
Caroline Dinenage MP	Baroness Walmsley	Sharon Hodgson MP	Baroness Young of Hornsey
Nigel Adams MP	Baroness Sharp of Guildford	Clive Betts MP	Lord Bichard (vice-chair)
David Tredinnick MP	Lord Maclennan of Rogart	Nick Raynsford MP	Lord Broers
Lord Brooke of Sutton Mandeville	Lord Cotter	Paul Farrelly MP	Lord Smith of Finsbury
Lord Jenkin of Roding		Baroness Whitaker (vice-chair)	Lord Boswell of Aynho
		Baroness McIntosh	
		Baroness Kingsmill	
		Baroness Morris of Yardley	
		Lord Rogers of Riverside (President)	
		Lord MacDonald of Tradeston	
		Lord Haskel	
		Lord Stevenson of Balmacara	
		Lord Howarth of Newport	
		Lord Bhattacharyya	

== Associate Members ==
As an Associate Parliamentary Group, membership of the APDIG is open to individuals and organisations from outside Parliament. The APDIG currently has ten associate members, comprising several of the leading organisations from across the UK creative and design industries:

- Design Council
- Design Business Association
- Crafts Council
- Design & Technology Association
- Creative & Cultural Skills
- Council for Higher Education in Art and Design (CHEAD)
- British Institute of Interior Design
- Design Museum
- The Human Centered Design Society
- Images&Co Design Group

== See also ==
- All-Party Parliamentary Group
- Creative industries
- British Design
- Policy Connect
