= Matthew Carmona =

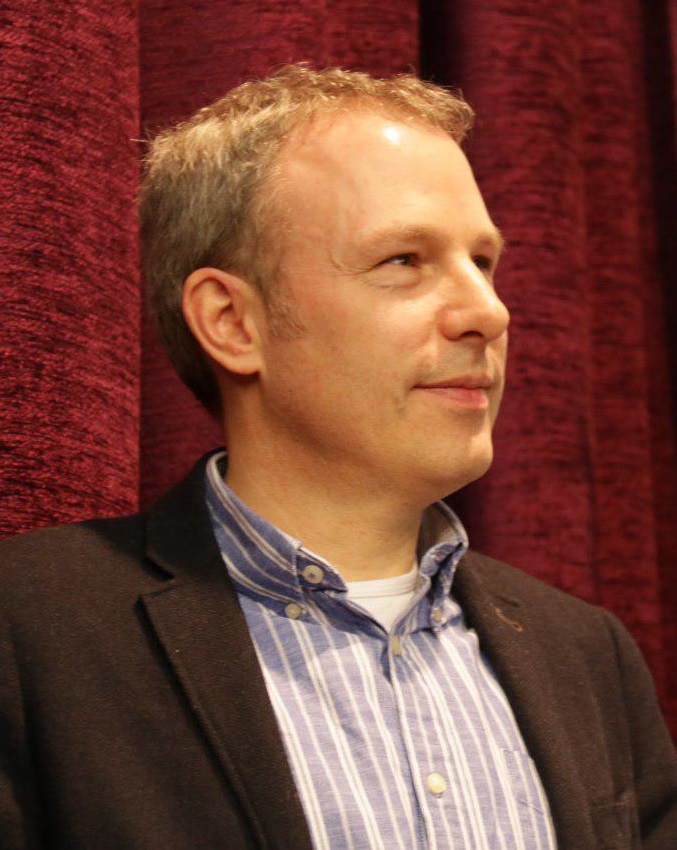
- Education: University of Nottingham
- Occupations: Architect, planner and researcher
- Website: matthew-carmona.com

Matthew Carmona is an architect, planner and researcher based in the United Kingdom. His research focuses on the process of design governance and management of Public Space. He has taught at the University of Nottingham and The Bartlett, the latter since 1998.

Carmona serves as the chair of the Place Alliance, a collaborative alliance for place quality that he helped in founding in 2014. He regularly works as an advisor to governments in the UK as well as in other countries. He was the Specialist Advisor to the House of Lords Select Committee on the Built Environment in 2015 and 2025.

In 2015, 2022 and 2024 Carmona received the RTPI Academic Award for Research Excellence and in 2016 (for the Place Alliance) and 2025 the RTPI Sir Peter Hall Award for Wider Engagement. In 2018, Carmona received the AESOP Best Published Paper Award for his work on the governance of design. In 2021 he was awarded the Athena City Accolade. He is the European Associate Editor for the Journal of Urban Design and since 2003 has written a column for Town and Country Planning as well as his own blog Urban Design Matters. Carmona has published thirteen books and has written numerous articles.

== Education ==
Carmona joined the University of Nottingham for B.A. (Hons.) in Architecture and Environmental Design in 1984. Upon completing his degree, he continued studying at the University of Nottingham for BArch, completed in 1990, followed by an M.A. in Environmental Planning, completed in 1991.

== Career ==
After completing his Master's degree, Carmona began his private practice as an architect and joined a part-time PhD program at University of Nottingham in 1992. The focus of his PhD was residential design guidance in England which sparked his fascination with the governance of design. Later in 1993, he got a job as a researcher with John Punter, first at the University of Reading and then at the University of Strathclyde. Through their research, they co-authored the book, The Design Dimension of Planning.

In 1995, Carmona came back to the University of Nottingham as a lecturer. Inspired by his teaching at the University of Nottingham, he co-authored Public Places Urban Spaces: The Dimensions of Urban Design, which became one of his best known books, now in its third edition. In 1998, Carmona completed his Ph.D. and left University of Nottingham to join University College London’s The Bartlett School of Planning.

In 2003, Carmona was appointed as the Head of The Bartlett School of Planning and led the re-building and expansion of the school, including the re-design of its teaching programs. He was promoted to full Professor in 2005. In 2008, he became a member of the CABE (Commission for Architecture and the Built Environment) Research Reference Group and served in this role until 2011. He is best known for his work in four key areas: on the value of urban design (place value); theorising the governance of design in the public sector (design governance), on high streets and public spaces, and for his theory of urban design, The Place-shaping Continuum.

Carmona stepped down from his position as the Head of the Bartlett School of Planning in 2011 and subsequently led the development of the Urban Skills Portal (since evolved into the Graphics Skills Portal), a new research-led urban design program, MRes Inter-disciplinary Urban Design, and the Place Alliance. He continues to serve as the chair of the Place Alliance, steering it towards a stronger evidential and campaigning role.

In 2015, he was appointed as Specialist Advisor to the House of Lords Select Committee on the Built Environment. The committee presented its report Constructing Better Places the next year, highlighting the fundamental changes required for national and local policy for planning and place-making in England. He was appointed as Special Advisor to the same committee again in 2025, this time to advise on the New Towns: Building Communities inquiry in which achieving design and place quality was the major focus.

Carmona has written articles for many journals, most notably for the Journal of Urban Design, Urban Design International, Journal of Urbanism, and Progress in Planning. He was the book series editor for the Design in the Built Environment series published by Ashgate (now Routledge) between 1999 and 2017.

Carmona was Elected a fellow of the Academy of Social Sciences, the Royal Society for the Arts and the Academy of Urbanism. He is a registered architect in the UK and a member of the Royal Town Planning Institute, where he served on the Council between 2002 and 2005. He has been an active member of the Urban Design Group Urban Design editorial board since 1997. In 2018 he launched place-value-wiki, an open source platform for sharing research on health, economic, social and environmental value of better place quality and between 2019 and 2021 co-led an international research collaboration - Urban Maestro – with UN-Habitat to examine the use of soft urban design governance tools across Europe.

== Awards and honours ==
- 2025 - RTPI Sir Peter Hall Award for Wider Engagement
- 2024 - RTPI Academic Award for Research Excellence
- 2022 - RTPI Sir Peter Hall Award for Excellence in Research and Engagement
- 2021 - The Athena City Accolade
- 2018 – AESOP Prize paper, awarded
- 2017 – AESOP Prize Paper, short-listed
- 2016 – RTPI Sir Peter Hall Award for Wider Engagement
- 2015 – RTPI Academic Award for Research Excellence
- 2011 – Awarded Fellowship by the Japan Society for the Promotion of Science
- 2008 – AESOP Prize Paper, short-listed
- 2001 – West Kowloon (Hong Kong) Reclamation International Urban Design Competition, First Prize
- 1998 – AESOP Prize Paper, Short-listed
- 1996 – AESOP Prize Paper, short-listed
- 1989 – British Steel Architectural Student Award Winner

== Bibliography ==
- Urban Design Governance, Soft Powers and the European Experience (2023)
- Public Places Urban Spaces, The Dimensions of Urban Design 3rd Edition (2021)
- Design Governance: The CABE Experiment (2017)
- Explorations in Urban Design: An Urban Design Research Primer (2014)
- Capital Spaces, The Multiple Complex Spaces of a Global City (2012)
- Public Places Urban Spaces, The Dimensions of Urban Design 2nd Edition (2010)
- Public Space, The Management Dimension (2008)
- Urban Design Reader (2007)
- Measuring Quality in Planning, Managing the Performance Process (2004)
- Delivering New Homes: Processes, Planners and Providers (2003)
- Public Spaces Urban Spaces, The Dimensions of Urban Design (2003)
- The Value of Urban Design (2001)
- Housing Design Quality: Through Policy, Guidance and Review (2001)
- The Design Dimension of Planning: Theory, Content and Best Practice for Design Policies (1997)
