= Neba Sere =

German architect (born 1990)

Neba Sere (born November 1990) is a German UK-based spatial practitioner, researcher, educator, and advocate, known for her work in decolonising the built environment, architectural education, and promoting diversity in architecture. She is Co-Director of Black Females in Architecture (BFA), an associate professor, and first Director of Decolonising and Decarbonising at the Bartlett School of Architecture, UCL. She is also the trustee Build Up Foundation.

In 2024–25 she was appointed Design Researcher in Residence at the Design Museum’s Future Observatory, focusing on decolonisation, vernacular construction and ecological knowledge. Her projects include acting as engagement lead for the Waterden Green Space for Teenage Girls at Queen Elizabeth Olympic Park, and contributing to exhibitions such as Earth, Memory and the Spaces We Inhabit at London’s NOW Gallery.
