= Michael Batty =

British urban planner

Michael Batty CBE FBA FRS FAcSS
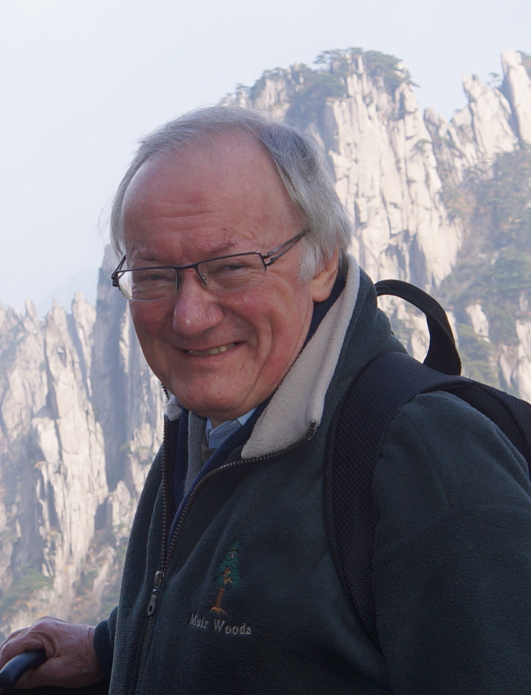
- Michael Batty
- Born: 11 January 1945 (age 81); Liverpool
- Occupations: Urban Planner & Geographer

Academic background
- Education: University of Manchester (BA, 1966); University of Wales (PhD, 1984)

Michael Batty CBE FBA FRS FAcSS (born 11 January 1945) is a British academic currently appointed as Bartlett Professor of Planning in The Bartlett at University College London. His work spans the fields of urban planning, geography and spatial data science. He has been Director—now Chairman—of the Centre for Advanced Spatial Analysis, set up when he was appointed to UCL in 1995. His research and the work of CASA is focused on computer models of city systems. He was awarded the William Alonso Prize of the Regional Science Association in 2011 for his book Cities and Complexity, the same prize a second time for his book The New Science of Cities in 2017–2018, the University Consortium GIS Research Award in 2012, and the Lauréat Prix International de Géographie Vautrin Lud, the so-called 'Nobel for geography', in 2013. In 2015, he was awarded the Founder's Medal of the Royal Geographical Society and in 2016, the Gold Medal of the Royal Town Planning Institute (RTPI). He also received the Senior Scholar Award of the Complex Systems Society in September 2016.

== Education ==
Michael Batty was born in Liverpool and educated at Northway County Primary School from 1950 to 1956 and then at Quarry Bank High School for Boys from 1956 to 1962. He went to the University of Manchester (1962–1966) where he studied Town and Country Planning gaining the BA degree with First Class Honours in 1966. His PhD is from the University of Wales, Institute of Science and Technology in 1984. The thesis on Pseudo Dynamic Urban Models was made available online in 2012.

== Current affiliations ==
- Bartlett professor of planning in the Bartlett School at UCL where he is chairman of the Centre for Advanced Spatial Analysis (CASA). From 1995 to 2003, he was professor of spatial analysis and planning, holding a joint appointment between the department of geography and the Bartlett School of Planning at UCL. In 2003 Mike became Bartlett Professor of Planning, succeeding Professor Sir Peter Hall.
- Visiting distinguished professor at Arizona State University.
- Honorary professor at Cardiff University.
- Distinguished Vice Chancellor's Professor, Chinese University of Hong Kong
- Distinguished professor, Hong Kong Polytechnic University
- Editor of the journal Environment and Planning B: Planning and Design.

== Academic career ==
He began his academic career in the University of Manchester in 1966, where he was appointed an assistant lecturer in town and country planning. He then spent 10 years at the University of Reading as research assistant, lecturer and reader in geography. During this time he spent one year as a visiting assistant professor of transport planning in the department of civil engineering in the University of Waterloo, Ontario. He moved to the University of Wales Institute of Science and Technology (now the University of Cardiff) in 1979, where he was professor of town planning. During this time, he acted as head of department, and dean of the faculty of environmental design. In 1990, he moved to direct the US National Science Foundation (NSF) National Center for Geographic Information and Analysis (NCGIA) at the State University of New York at Buffalo (SUNY-Buffalo), where he was a professor of geography.

He has held several visiting appointments in computing, engineering, planning, and geography at the following universities: University of Illinois; University of Melbourne; University of Hong Kong; University of Bristol; University of Michigan; and he currently has visiting appointments at Cardiff University and Arizona State University.

== Scholarship ==
His research has focussed on the development of analytical methods and computer models for simulating the structure of cities and regions. Early work involved aggregate land use transport models which are summarised in his first book Urban Modelling. After this early work, he focused on more visual representations of cities and their models and some of these were represented in his second book Microcomputer Graphics. With Paul Longley, he published Fractal Cities. This work established the idea that cities might be regarded as the outcome of self-similar fractal processes generating structure from the bottom up. His work on complexity theory in urban analysis and planning is the focus of his book Cities and Complexity, a summary of which is available on his ComplexCity web site. His book The New Science of Cities. ties many of the ideas together, developing the notion that it is flows rather than locations that are key to an understanding not only of cities but also the processes for their design and planning. His most recent book Inventing Future Cities was published by MIT Press in 2018 and focuses on the idea that we can invent the future with respect to cities but can never predict them.

He has edited several volumes, most recently Agent-Based Models of Geographical Systems and Virtual Geographic Environments.

Details of his publications are available from his curriculum vita and on his personal web pages.

== Memberships and Fellowships ==
Learned Societies: He has been elected a Fellow of the Chinese Academy of Sciences in 2023, a Fellow of the Royal Society (FRS) in 2009, a Fellow of the British Academy in 2001, a Fellow of Academy of Social Sciences in 2001 and a Fellow of the Royal Society of Arts in 1982.

Professional Institutes: He has been a Member and now Fellow of the Royal Town Planning Institute since 1971, and the Chartered Institute of Logistics and Transport since 1984. He has been a Fellow of the Royal Geographical Society since 1972.

== Past Roles ==
He has recently acted as: Member of the Advisory Panel on Public Sector Information – APPSI, Chair of the ESRC Census Advisory Committee, and a Member of the UK Research Assessment Exercise (RAE) 2004–2009 Geography Panel.

At Cardiff, he was a Member of the Computer Board for British Universities and Research Councils, now JISC (1988–1990), a Member of the SERC (Science and Engineering Research Council) Transport Committee (1982–1985), Chair (1980–1982), then vice-chair (1982–1984) of the ESRC (Economic and Social Research Council) Environment and Planning Committee, and chair of the Conference of Heads of Planning Schools (CHOPS) 1986–1980.

== Honours ==
Year awarded	Name of Award	Awarding organisation	Reason for award
2016	CSS Senior Scientific Award	Complex Systems Society	He has pioneered the idea of cities as complex systems, as well as for his leading role in the conformation of the Science of Cities that combines a wide spectrum of disciplines ranging from Statistical Physics, Mathematics, Architecture and Engineering, to Social Sciences and Economics.)
2013	Vautrin Lud Prize
2010	Alonso Prize	Regional Science Association	Cities and Complexity (MIT Press, Cambridge, MA, 2005)
2004	CBE		Services to geography
2002	Innovation	Association of Geographic Information
1999	Sir George Back Award	Royal Geographical Society	Contributions to national policy and practice in planning and city design
1998	Technological Progress	Association of Geographic Information
