= UCL Centre for Advanced Spatial Analysis =

Research centre

Coordinates: 51.52194°N 0.13595°W

The Centre for Advanced Spatial Analysis (CASA) is a research centre at University College London (UCL), which specialises in the application and visualisation of spatial analytic techniques and simulation models to cities and regions. It is a constituent department of The Bartlett Faculty of the Built-Environment (The Bartlett School).

== History ==
CASA was established in 1995 by a group of UCL academics who wanted a focus for their research across different academic departments in the field of geographic information systems (GIS). Michael Batty was appointed the first director and initially held a joint appointment as Professor of Spatial Analysis and Planning in the Departments of Geography and The Bartlett School of Planning. He is now Chairman of the centre. In 2000, Paul Longley was appointed deputy director and Professor of Geographic Information Science. He now directs UCL's ESRC Consumer Data Research Centre (CDRC).

CASA is still largely funded through research grants but from 2010 it began to diversify, introducing Masters programmes in spatial analysis and in Smart Cities. Professor Andrew Hudson-Smith took over the directorship in 2011 and appointed a deputy director, Dr Adam Dennett in 2016. Adam Dennett is now the director of the Centre and associate professor. Masters courses developed since 2010 include MSc's in Smart Cities and Urban Analytics and Spatial Data Science and Visualisation. It currently has 10 lecturers/associate Professors and two teaching fellows leading its courses. Sir Alan Wilson was appointed Professor of Urban and Regional Systems in 2008 but moved to the Turing Institute in 2016. The centre is now an administrative unit in The Bartlett Faculty of the Built Environment.

== Research areas ==
CASA researches the science of cities, working with city governments and related research groups on simulating and visualising urban problems. Their work on transport and movement has included Transport for London’s Oyster card data, public bikes schemes such as the London's cycle hire scheme, population segregation in large cities as well as climate change in the London region. The centre is active in exploring how the Internet of Things can be deployed in large urban areas linking objects in the built environment through internet technologies, and was active with the Technology Strategy Board’s Future Cities Catapult in pioneering new software systems for smart cities such as dashboards and portals. Its research programme in city science concentrates on applying social physics to urban systems based on modelling the diffusion of behaviours such as the 2011 London riots and it is heavily involved in using methods of scaling and allometry to examine city performance.

== Research programme ==
CASA's research programme is primarily funded by research grants from the British research councils, mainly ESRC and EPSRC. Since 2008, the centre has been increasingly funded by EU research grants from the 7th Framework and from the European Research Council (ERC) and in 2014, it was awarded funding from the Technology Strategy Board's Future Cities Catapult to provide demonstration capabilities for urban and regional modelling.

CASA has graduated some 50 PhDs since 2000. Several alumni have made important contributions to the science of cities working in geographic information systems, spatial analysis and urban modelling at UC Berkeley, Maryland, NYU, George Mason, UCL, KRISH, LSE, TU-Istanbul, KCL, Cardiff, Tehran, Manchester, OU, ETH-Zurich, kingston, Malta, Warwick, Birkbeck, and Liverpool. OpenStreetMap (OSM) originated in UCL CASA and The Bartlett, and the firms GeoFutures and Intelligent Space (acquired by Atkins) were associated with the centre. The company Prospective Labs spun-off from CASA in 2016 and is engaged on developing new software systems for planning and land management.

== Contributions ==
Members of CASA have pioneered the development of urban and regional modelling through a series of books that go back to the 1970s. Their work is published in a series of web sites on the CASA Blog Aggregator. Key works that reflect CASA's research programme are Fractal Cities (1994), Cities and Complexity (2005), The Science of Cities and Regions (2012), Agent Based Model of Geographical Systems (2012), and The New Science of Cities (2013). The journals Environment and Planning B, edited by Batty, and Future Internet, edited by Hudson-Smith, are run from CASA. The major research focus of CASA is in blending the visualisation of complex urban systems with their simulation.
