= Christine Hawley =

British architect, born 1949

Christine Hawley CBE (born 1949) is an English architect and academic. She was Head of the Bartlett School of Architecture at University College London.

== Early life and education ==
Hawley was born in 1949 in Shrewsbury. She was educated at the City of London School for Girls, and completed an Architectural Association Diploma at the Architectural Association School of Architecture, graduating in 1975.

== Career ==
As a student, Hawley worked in the Department of the Environment in London and practised with Renton, Howard, Wood and Levin Architects. She then worked with De Soissons and Yorke Rosenberg and Mardell (1972-73). Subsequently, she became a partner in Cook and Hawley Architects (1975) and in the 1980s practised with Pearson International Architects. In 1998, she established Christine Hawley Architects.

Hawley's architectural practice focusses on creating high-quality affordable housing, and her London firm has won multiple awards. With Cook, she won an international competition for the Pfaffenberg museum in Austria, though the museum was never built.

She was a lecturer at the Architectural Association from 1979 to 1987, and Head of the School of Architecture at the University of East London from 1987 to 1993. She served as an adviser on the Commission for Architecture and the Built Environment.

In 1993, she became professor of architectural studies at the Bartlett, the first female professor in the department and in 1999 became the first female Dean of the Faculty of the Built Environment and Head of School at the Barlett.

== Awards and honours ==
- Commander of the Order of the British Empire (CBE), 2008.
- RIBA Annie Spink Award, 2016
