= Janet Whitaker, Baroness Whitaker =

The Right Honourable The Baroness Whitaker
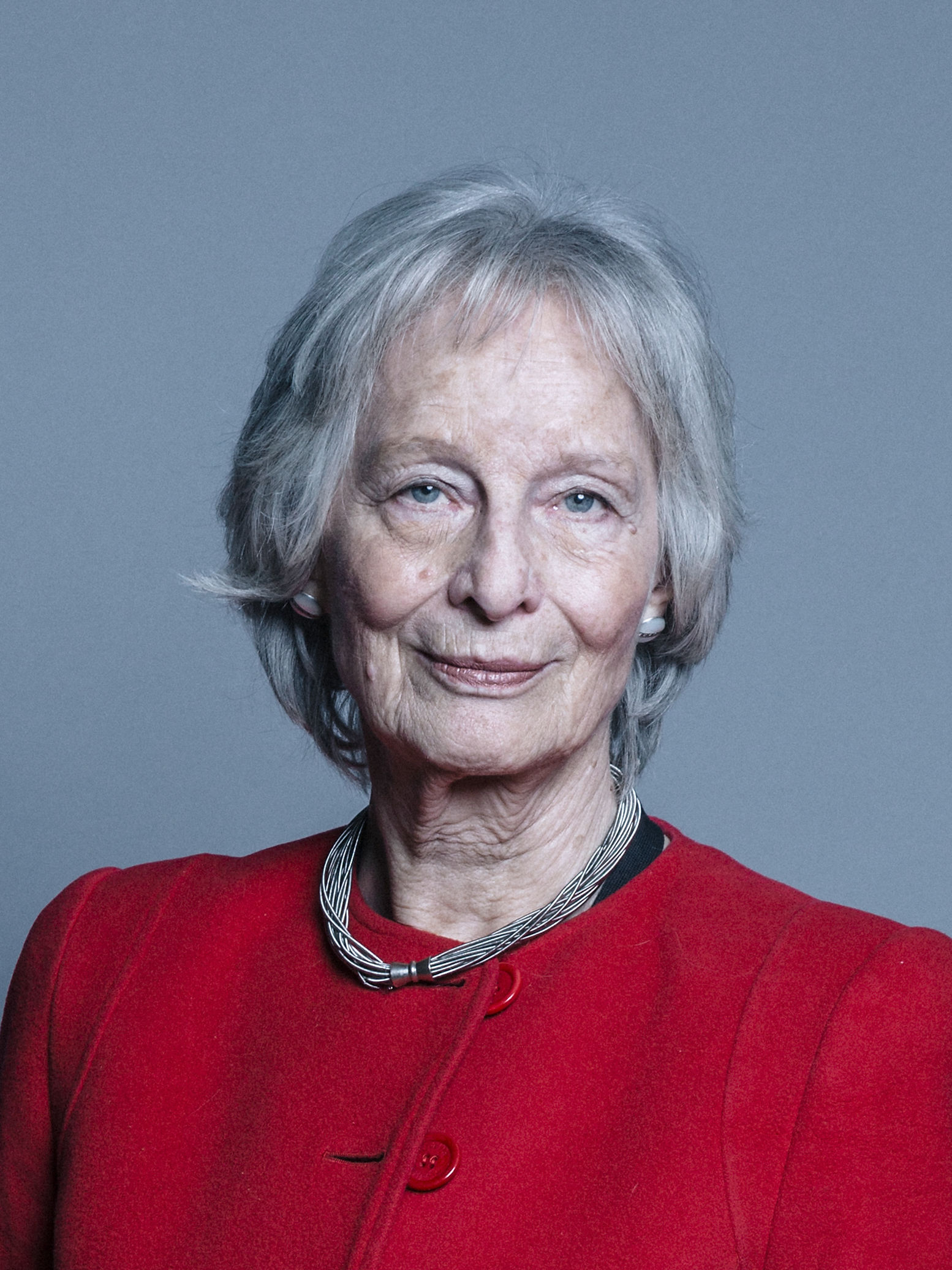
- Official Portrait of Baroness Whitaker

Member of the House of Lords
- Lord Temporal
- Life peerage 5 August 1999

Personal details
- Born: Janet Alison Stewart; 20 February 1936 (age 90)
- Party: Labour
- Spouse: Benjamin Whitaker
- Education: Nottingham High School for Girls; Girton College, Cambridge; Bryn Mawr College; Harvard University

Janet Alison Whitaker, Baroness Whitaker (née Stewart; born 20 February 1936) is a British politician with the Labour Party.

Born Janet Alison Stewart, she is the daughter of Alan Harrison Stewart and Ella Stewart (née Saunders). She was educated at Nottingham High School for Girls, Girton College, Cambridge in the United Kingdom and at Bryn Mawr College and Harvard University in the United States. In 1964 she married Benjamin Whitaker (1934–2014) a barrister, author and human rights activist, who served a single term as Labour Party MP for Hampstead from 1966 to 1970.

Whitaker began her career in publishing. She was a Commissioning Editor with the English publishing house Andre Deutsch Ltd from 1961 until 1968. From 1974 to 1996 she was with the Employment Department Group. She was then employed by the Commonwealth Secretariat as a consultant for the Commission for Racial Equality (1996–98). She was then with Independent Television Commission (ITC) starting in 1999, serving as the Deputy Chair from 2001 to 2003. During that time, she was a consultant to the Committee of Reference for Friends Provident insurance company from 1999 to 1998.

In June 1999, she was included in Tony Blair's new list of working peers in recognition of a career in publishing and in the civil service. She was created a Life Peer on 5 August 1999 taking the title Baroness Whitaker, of Beeston in the County of Nottinghamshire. She is Co-Chair of the All-Party Parliamentary Group for Gypsies, Travellers and Roma and President of Friends, Families and Travellers and of the Advisory Council for the Education of Romany and other Travellers

Whitaker joined the House of Lords on 5 August 1999. Since then she has sat on committees including Home Affairs, Human Rights, and Intergovernmental Organisations. Her focus within the UK is East Sussex and Nottingham. She was an International Development Liaison Peer from 1999 to 2007 and served as Vice-Chair of the UK Parliamentary Labour Party International Development Committee. She chaired the Design in Public Procurement Inquiry (2009) and the Design Education Inquiry (2011). Whitaker lists her political interests as architecture and design, international development and race relations.

Whitaker supports humanism in the House of Lords. Contributions include amending Bills to specify obligations to observe good design in housing and planning, to widen scope beyond classic religion to include belief and values; Bills so amended include the Communications Bill, Asylum Bill, Charities Bill 2005, Equality Bill, Education and Inspections Bill, Housing and Planning bill. She is a Patron of Humanists UK, and a member of the Advisory Board for the British Institute of Human Rights.

Whitaker was co-opted to the Virtual advisory panel of the United Nations Association – UK, the independent policy authority on the UN in the UK. and is a member of the All‐Party Parliamentary Group on the United Nations (UN APPG) from the House of Lords.

Whitaker was a Magistrate from 1984 until 2001. She was a member of the Employment Tribunal from 1995 to 2000. From 1996 to 1999 she served on the Camden Racial Equality Council, first as Deputy Chair and then as Chair. Currently, she is president of the South Downs Society.

== Professional, educational, and humanitarian affiliations ==
- British Institute of Human Rights: Advisory Board, 2005–
- Employment Tribunal: member, 1995–2000
- Immigration Complaints Audit Committee: 1998–99
- One World Trust: Vice-President and former Trustee
- Overseas Development Institute: Council Member, 2003–
- Royal Institute of British Architects: Fellow
- South Downs Society: President
- Tavistock and Portman NHS Trust: Non-executive Director, 1997–2001
- Transparency International (UK): former member of the Advisory Council, 2001–20??
- UNICEF UK (United Kingdom Committee for UNICEF): Trustee
- United Nations Association – UK: member of Virtual advisory panel, member of the Lords' All‐Party Parliamentary Group
- Working Men's College Corporation: Chair of the Board 1999–2002, Emeritus Governor, Fellow of the College, and Sponsor/Patron
