= The Bartlett =

Component of University College London

The Bartlett Faculty of the Built Environment
- Type: Public
- Established: 1841; 185 years ago
- Parent institution: University College London
- Dean: Jacqui Glass
- Administrative staff: 300
- Students: 3,500
- Location: Bloomsbury, Central London, England; 51.525888°N 0.132615°W
- Campus: Urban
- Website: www.ucl.ac.uk/bartlett

The Bartlett Faculty of the Built Environment, also known as The Bartlett, is the academic centre for the study of the built environment at University College London (UCL), United Kingdom. It is home to thirteen departments, with specialisms including architecture, urban planning, construction, project management, public policy and environmental design.

The Bartlett is consistently ranked highest in Europe, and among the highest in the world, for architecture and the built environment categories in major rankings. It is currently ranked the first in the world for the year 2025.

== History ==
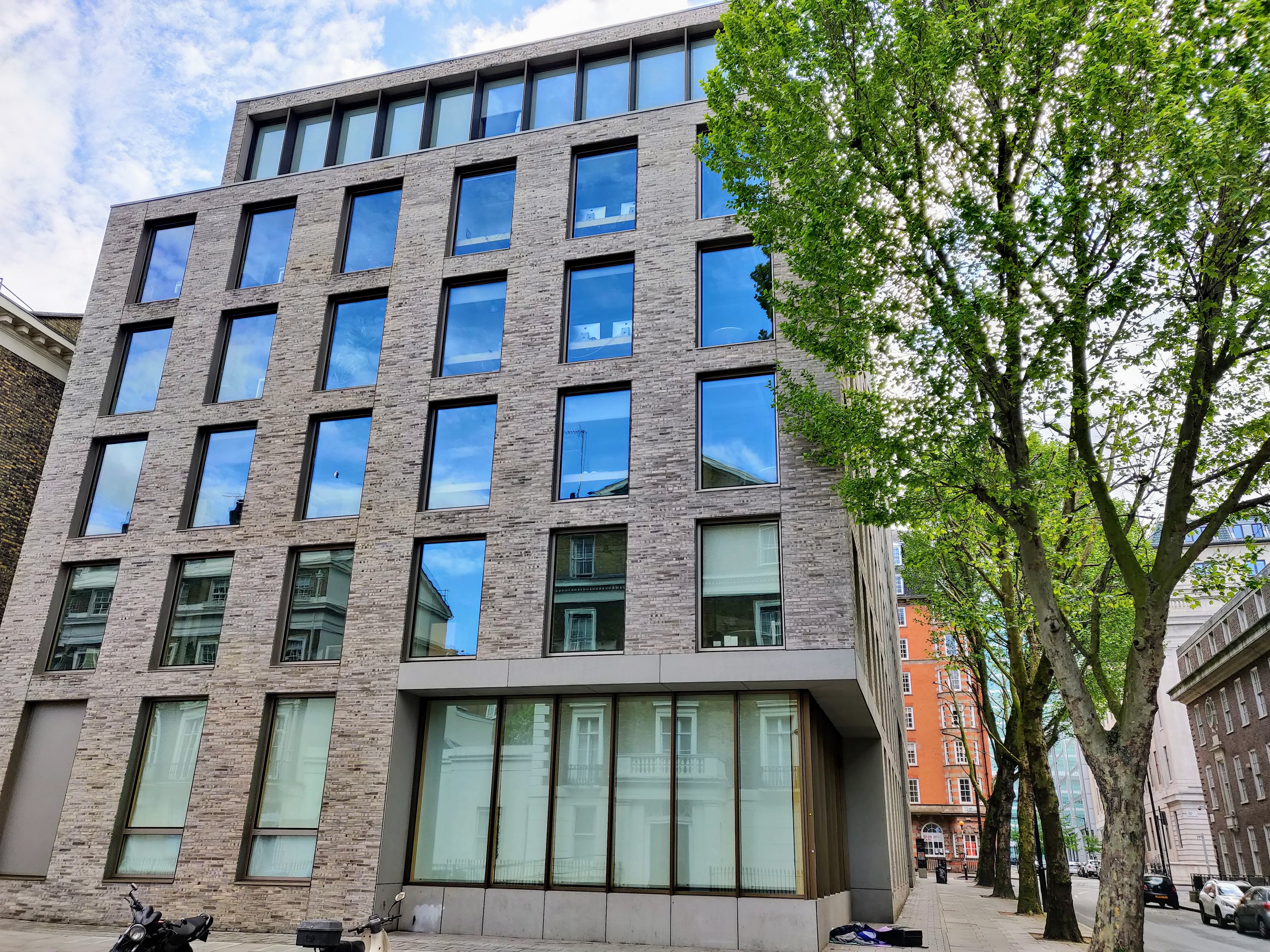
22 Gordon Street faculty building

University College London created its first chair of architecture in 1841, making The Bartlett the first architecture and built environment school established in the UK. A Chair in Planning was created at UCL in 1914 and The Department of Urban Planning then merged with the School of Architecture. The faculty was named The Bartlett in 1919 when the original benefactor, Sir Herbert Bartlett consented to his name being given to the department. It is currently one of UCL's 11 constituent faculties.

== Campus and locations ==
The faculty has three sites across London - at UCL's Bloomsbury and East campuses and at Here East, in the Queen Elizabeth Olympic Park.

=== Bloomsbury ===
On the Bloomsbury campus, The Bartlett Faculty is based at 169 Euston Road. The Bartlett School of Architecture has been based at 22 Gordon Street since 2016, which was built around the retained structure of the old building, Wates House. Five of The Bartlett's departments (the School of Planning and Institutes of Sustainable Resources, Sustainable Heritage, Environmental Design & Engineering and the Energy Institute) and its library are located in Central House. The Bartlett School of Construction and Project Management is housed in 1-19 Torrington Place. The Bartlett Development Planning Unit is located in 34 Tavistock Square. The Centre for Advanced Spatial Analysis is located in 90 Tottenham Court Road.

=== Here East ===
In 2017, The Bartlett and UCL Engineering expanded into new facilities at Here East, on the site of the London Olympics Media Centre.

=== UCL East ===
The UCL East campus opened in 2022, located on the Queen Elizabeth Olympic Park, where The Bartlett joins seven other UCL faculties in a transdisciplinary hub for study, research and engagement in east London.

== Organisation ==
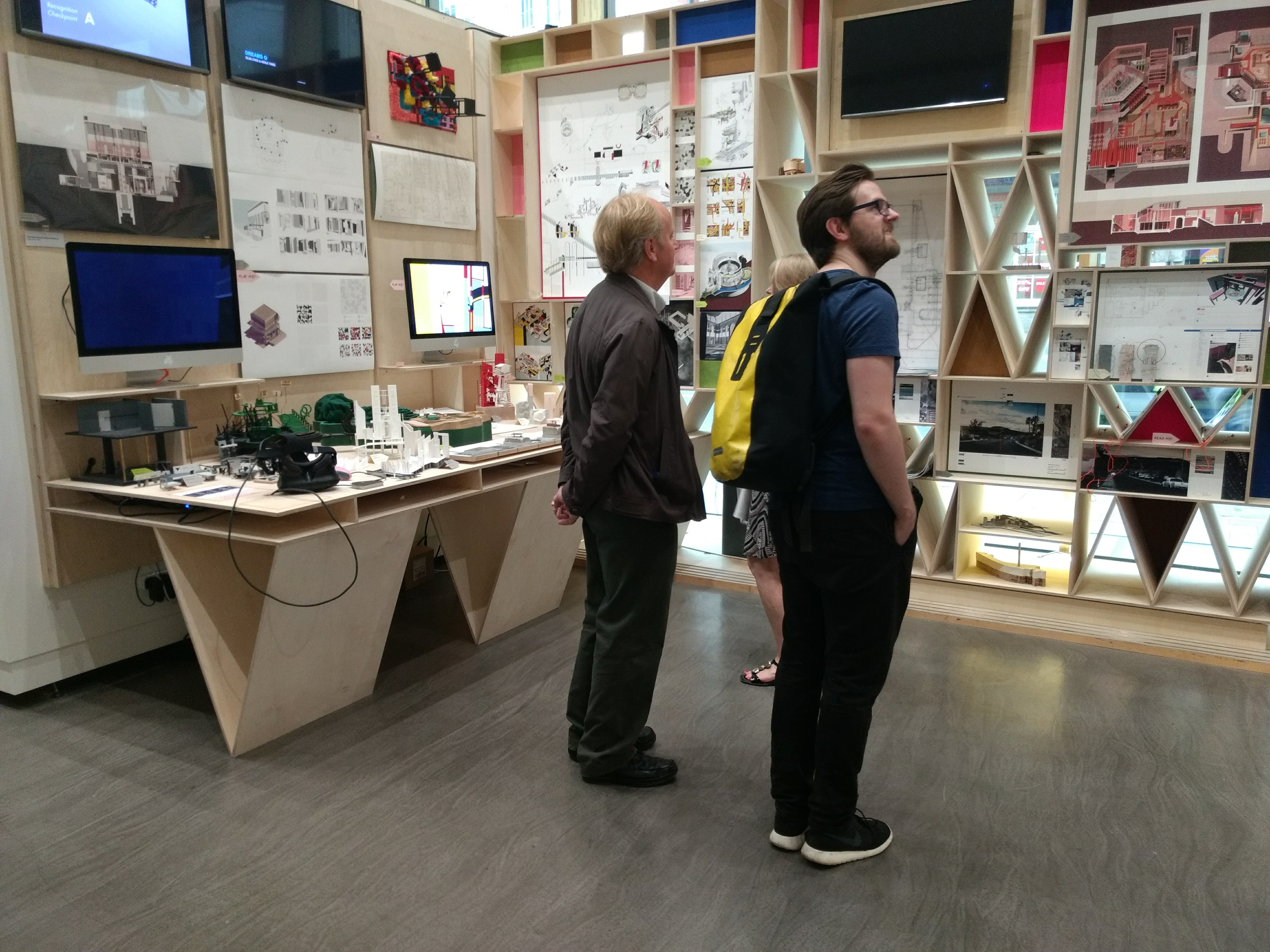
The Bartlett Summer Show in 2017

The Bartlett Faculty of the Built Environment is the UK's largest and leading multidisciplinary faculty of the built environment, covering architecture, landscape architecture, planning, construction and project management, development planning and environmental design as well as many other specialist fields. It is particularly well known for its architecture and planning schools. The faculty undertakes research in the built environment, and is known for developing the space syntax theory. The current dean is Jacqui Glass (professor in construction management).

=== The Bartlett School of Architecture ===
In 2011, the university appointed Frédéric Migayrou as the new Bartlett Professor of Architecture. Notable professors include Iain Borden, Adrian Forty, Jonathan Hill, CJ Lim, Alan Penn and Jane Rendell. The current director of the Bartlett School of Architecture is Professor Amy Kulper.

The Bartlett School of Architecture courses are validated by the Royal Institute of British Architects (RIBA). The school was rated by the Architects' Journal as the best architecture school in the UK for 11 years, and consistently ranks in the top in The Guardian university league tables for architecture.

In 2013, the research publication Survey of London moved from English Heritage to join the School of Architecture. The school also houses the Space Syntax Laboratory, the international centre of the theory and methodology of space syntax.

==== Allegations of racism, sexism and bullying ====
In May 2021, The Guardian reported that 21 former Bartlett School of Architecture students had complained of sexism and racism going back over a decade, alleging inappropriate comments were made about appearance and race, with some female students reduced to tears. The findings came from a report compiled by Eleni Kyriacou, who had experienced sexism while studying at the institution in 2000. UCL said it was "aware of issues", was working to address them, and had launched an investigation into the complaints. Two months later, UCL refused to respond to freedom of information requests from Kyriacou, claiming they were "vexatious", burdensome to manage and covered similar ground to previous requests. Meanwhile, a group of former students, 'Bartlett United', hired a solicitor to further examine the claims, as an Architects' Journal investigation revealed further allegations of students being bullied and humiliated by tutors, resulting in mental health problems. In October 2021, UCL appointed an external investigator, Howlett Brown, to review culture and behaviours at the Bartlett, after more than 70 testimonies from current and former staff and students at the Bartlett were given to their own lawyers by Bartlett United. UCL's pro-provost for equity and inclusion, Sasha Roseneil, said she was "aware that unacceptable behaviour takes place at UCL" and said that recommendations by Howlett Brown would seek to "ensure that all of [UCL's] students and staff are treated fairly and able to thrive".

The Howlett Brown review was completed in April 2022 and on 9 June 2022, UCL publicly apologised to current and former students and staff for a decades-old "culture of unacceptable behaviour" at the Bartlett School of Architecture. Michael Spence, UCL's president and provost, said "I want to apologise to everyone who has suffered because of the culture of bullying, harassment and sexual misconduct within the Bartlett School of Architecture." The 119-page Howlett Brown report identified "uncomfortable truths and several ‘open secrets’ about the BSA", citing power, protectionism, a "boys' club" culture that allowed a lack of accountability, and a fear of speaking out "woven into the fabric of the BSA for a long period of time". The report's authors heard serious allegations, some dating back the early 1990s, of staff making sexist comments and verbally attacking female students, in addition to allegedly misogynistic, discriminatory, and antisemitic behaviour. Howlett Brown urged the university to investigate allegations about BSA staff further, and recommended changes to tutor hiring and staff training, plus provision of long-term counselling and support options. BSA director Bob Sheil stepped down early as head of the school, with construction management professor Jacqui Glass appointed interim director. The school also suspended some staff from student-facing and administrative duties with immediate effect. Kyriacou said: "I'm glad to see they've finally suspended staff members. I think they should just be fired quite frankly. I think they should be named. I think their careers should end in shame. They need to reboot the whole school, which is what the report says. I hope they do it." Kyriacou later also called for compensation for those who suffered most ("UCL should look into the cases of students who were unfairly graded and see whether there is a way of awarding them their part Is") and payment of medical expenses such as the counselling fees incurred by some students.

The Architects Registration Board subsequently requested an urgent meeting with the Bartlett, concerned that the school may have breached ARB rules on diversity and equality. The ARB also raised the need for UCL-employed architects to meet the ARB Code of Conduct and Practice at all times, saying it would consider disciplinary action against any individuals named on its register. Responding to the scandal, the RIBA said it was considering a new education code of conduct for validated institutions, similar to the RIBA Code of Practice for Chartered Practices.

Two weeks after the staff suspensions, "last minute staffing changes at the school" were blamed for the cancellation of a five-day summer school at the Bartlett School of Architecture. Up to 150 students aged 16–18 had been due to attend the July 2020 course, including ten from non-traditional backgrounds. These places had been organised by HomeGrown Plus, an organisation aiming to improve diversity in architecture and the creative industries; it said: "It's hugely frustrating that HomeGrown Plus students will pay the price for an institution struggling to address issues that are fundamental in creating an open, inclusive environment for education."

On 30 June 2022, an open letter from 24 architectural bosses, curators and academics was published. It criticised the Bartlett's publication of the Howlett Brown review, the ensuing "blacklisting" of staff and continued "Kafkaesque" investigations, and claimed there was an online "witch hunt" targeting "decent and talented teachers". Kyriacou disagreed with the academics' description of the report as a "debacle", saying the "investigation was thorough, sensitively conducted, professional and sound. It brought to the surface and it very well assessed, alarming misconduct and patterns of behaviour that have gone on, without any accountability held, for an inexcusable length of time at UCL." Future Architects Front co-founder Charlie Edmonds said the open letter was a "disproportionate use of institutional power" with its core argument "myopic, reactionary, and fundamentally ignorant."

In February 2026, School of Architecture staff were reported to have formally complained to the Health and Safety Executive (HSE) about high levels of stress and excessive workloads. Staff representative said some of the issues stemmed from actions taken in 2022: "the Howlett Brown report created what we might call a 'mandate of change' narrative within the [school]. This enabled senior management to force through divisive initiatives and individual agendas, with insufficient regard to the cost of staff wellbeing and academic integrity." Bartlett Faculty of the Built Environment dean Jacqui Glass said the school had begun work to identify and implement practical steps to improve work allocation and related processes.

=== The Bartlett School of Planning ===
In 2011, Fulong Wu was appointed as Bartlett Professor of Planning. There have been a succession of eminent Bartlett Professors of Planning at UCL including Stanley Adshead, Sir Patrick Abercrombie, Lord William Holford, Lord Richard Llewelyn-Davies, Gerald Smart, Sir Peter Hall, Professor Michael Edwards, Michael Batty and Matthew Carmona, all of whom have been associated with planning and cities in Britain and elsewhere. Sir Patrick Geddes, the father of town planning, studied physiology at the college in the late 1870s.

=== The Bartlett Centre for Advanced Spatial Analysis ===
The Centre for Advanced Spatial Analysis (CASA) is The Bartlett's research centre for interdisciplinary urban analytics. It was established in 1995 by Professor Michael Batty, who sits as the centre's chairperson. It is currently headed by Jon Reades.

=== The Bartlett Development Planning Unit ===
The Bartlett Development Planning Unit (DPU) was founded in 1954 by Otto Königsberger. Formerly the Architectural Association Department of Tropical Studies, it was absorbed by UCL and joined The Bartlett Faculty in 1971. In the early 1990s, Caren Levy established the Gender Policy and Planning Programme, one of four internationally recognised programmes addressing gender inequality in this period. It runs a doctoral research programme leading to the award of PhD, six one-year master's degree courses and a professional Postgraduate Diploma. The current director of the DPU is Michael Walls. His predecessor was Julio Davila, and prior to him was Caren Levy. The DPU manages a diverse research portfolio and, specifically, was the founding partner of the Knowledge in Action for Urban Equality consortium with contributors across nine countries that aims to make cities fairer.

=== The Bartlett School of Sustainable Construction ===
Duccio Turin founded the Building Economics Research Unit at UCL in the 1960s and The Bartlett ran masters and undergraduate degrees in building economics and management in the early 1970s, which are still running. Peter W.G. Morris (emeritus professor of construction and project management), author of The Management of Projects, founded the precursor of The Bartlett School of Construction and Project Management in 2002. In May 2021, the Bartlett School of Construction and Project Management (BSCPM) changed its name to the Bartlett School of Sustainable Construction (BSSC). The school has expanded considerably since its conception and now has over 80 members of staff. The current director Priti Parikh (professor of infrastructure engineering and international development).

==== The Bartlett Real Estate Institute ====
The Bartlett Real Estate Institute was launched in the faculty in October 2018. The institute director is Niko Szumilo, associate professor in economics and finance of the built environment. Yolande Barnes, formerly director of world research at Savills, holds the chair. The institute now runs a masters programme in healthcare facilities which is one of the first of its kind in the UK. The institute is part of the Bartlett School of Sustainable Construction and is located at UCL at Here East.

==== Allegations of bullying, harassment and racism ====
Allegations were made in August 2022 in relation to the Bartlett School of Sustainable Construction. Nine academics wrote a joint letter to UCL saying they had "seen our own academic careers and lives and those of our colleagues destroyed through bullying, harassment, and other predatory practices". They said School staff had witnessed "bullying and deep racism" – including firing faculty members with no due process and "extending probation discriminatorily". UCL undertook to investigate the claims, and any others brought to its attention.

=== The Bartlett School of Environment, Energy and Resources ===
The Bartlett School of Environment Energy and Resources addresses the global challenges of sustainability transition through teaching and research carried out in its four institutes. Its current director is Neil Strachan.

==== UCL Energy Institute ====
The UCL Energy Institute was set up by the provost of UCL in June 2009 as a cross-faculty initiative within the built environment, to unify and strengthen research and teaching efforts in the field of energy. The founding director was Tadj Oreszczyn (professor of energy and environment). Professor Catalina Spataru is director of the institute. The institute is home to the RCUK Centre for Energy Epidemiology and the London-Loughborough Centre for Doctoral Training.

==== UCL Institute for Environmental Design and Engineering ====
The UCL Institute for Environmental Design and Engineering was formally established in 2014, however Richard Llewelyn-Davies had introduced Building Science to The Bartlett in 1960, and Ralph Hopkinson was appointed the first chair in Environmental Design and Engineering in 1965. Around one-third of the UK's lighting design community have completed the MSc Light and Lighting at UCL, which was established in 1987. The current director of the institute is Dejan Mumovic (professor of building performance analysis).

==== UCL Institute for Sustainable Heritage ====
The Institute for Sustainable Heritage (formerly the Centre for Sustainable Heritage) was established by May Cassar (professor of sustainable heritage) in 2001. May Cassar also directs the Centre for Doctoral Training in Science and Engineering in Arts, Heritage and Archaeology (SEAHA), a partnership between UCL, University of Oxford, and University of Brighton. SEAHA trains students with heritage, industry and policy partners via a research-based masters and doctorate programme. The current director of the institute is Josep Grau-Bove and the deputy director is Kalliopi Fouseki. In 2024, the institute celebrated the 20th anniversary of the Sustainable Heritage MSc program.

==== UCL Institute for Sustainable Resources ====
The UCL Institute for Sustainable Resources was launched in 2011, as part of an agreement with founding contributor BHP Billiton Sustainable Communities. Jim Watson is the director, and Raimund Bleischwitz is chair in sustainable global resources.

=== UCL Institute for Global Prosperity ===
The UCL Institute for Global Prosperity was launched in 2014 by founding director Henrietta Moore, who also holds the chair in Culture, Philosophy and Design. The institute leads The RELIEF Centre in collaboration with the American University of Beirut and the Centre for Lebanese Studies.

=== UCL Institute for Innovation and Public Purpose ===
The UCL Institute for Innovation and Public Purpose (IIPP) was established in October 2017 by founding director Mariana Mazzucato (professor in the economics of innovation and public value). Rainer Kattel (professor of innovation and public governance) is the deputy director. IIPP offers a PhD and an MPA programme. Honorary professors include Francesca Bria, Hilary Cottam, Wolfgang Drechsler, Carlota Perez, and Erik S. Reinert. Ian Hogarth, Charles Leadbeater, and Tim O'Reilly serve as visiting professors. Brian Eno, James K. Galbraith, Jayati Ghosh, Stephanie Kelton, Hermann Hauser, Roly Keating, Hadeel Ibrahim, Cornelia Parker, Roger Martin, and Jeffrey Sachs sit on the advisory board.

=== UCL Urban Laboratory ===
Established in 2005 as a university wide initiative, UCL Urban Laboratory is a cross-disciplinary centre for urban thinking, teaching, research and practice. The centre co-operates with four UCL departments: The Bartlett, Engineering Sciences, Social and Historical Sciences, and Arts and Humanities. Its director is Prof Catalina Ortiz.

=== Affiliate centres ===
==== UCL Robotics ====
UCL Robotics is a cross-faculty initiative to develop a teaching and research platform in robotics and autonomous systems. It operates within the faculties of Medical Sciences, Engineering Sciences and The Bartlett, and is based at Here East.

==== UCL Bartlett Library ====
The UCL Bartlett Library houses books, journals and DVDs. These include a variety of built environment databases, e-resources and books.

The library was originally located in Wates House but was relocated to Central House in 2014. The new premises were designed by Hawkins\Brown.

== Reputation and rankings ==
Global ranking table for architecture, the built-environment, and urban studies
Ranking	2025	2024	2023	2022	2021	2020	2019	2018	2017	2016	2015
The Guardian University Guide		1	3	4		2	2	3	2	1	2
CWUR Subject Ranking						2	N/A	N/A	2	N/A	N/A
QS World Ranking	1	1	1	1	2	3	1	2	2	N/A	N/A
The Complete University Guide	9					4	4	3	4	6	4
Times World Ranking (Arts & Humanities)		6	6	5	5	5	6	5	4	5	8

== Notable alumni and academics ==
=== Alumni ===
- Roz Barr
- Basil Al Bayati
- Sir Hugh Casson
- George Clarke
- Ethel Charles and Bessie Charles, first women to be admitted to RIBA (only allowed to audit as women were not permitted to officially enroll in architecture at UCL in the 1890s)
- Sarah Gibson, British MP
- Ivan Harbour
- Birkin Haward
- Frank Hoar
- Lesley Lokko
- Leonora Payne Ison
- Kemas Ridwan Kurniawan
- Eleni Kyriacou, fashion designer and whistleblower about Bartlett bullying scandal
- Gertrude Leverkus, first woman to officially enrol at the Bartlett, in 1915
- Arthur Ling, architect, urban planner and academic

=== Academics ===
- Sir Patrick Abercrombie
- Reyner Banham
- Michael Batty CBE FRS FBA
- Iain Borden, professor of architecture & urban culture
- Matthew Carmona
- Sir Peter Cook
- Hector Corfiato, professor of architecture (1946–59)
- John Harvey, member of the Imperial Fascist League and lecturer on architecture
- Christine Hawley, first female professor and dean
- Richard Llewelyn-Davies, Baron Llewelyn-Davies, professor of architecture (1960 to 1969), professor of urban planning and head of the School of Environmental Studies (1970 to 1975)
- Thomas Leverton Donaldson, first professor of architecture at UCL
- Paul Ekins OBE, director of the UCL Institute for Sustainable Resources (ISR)
- Adrian Forty, professor of architectural history
- Hannah Fry, senior lecturer at The Bartlett Centre for Advanced Spatial Analysis (CASA)
- Sir Peter Hall FBA
- Nigel Harris, emeritus professor of the economy of the city
- Jonathan Hill, professor of architecture and visual theory
- Josephine Kane, British academic and historian of architecture
- Rainer Kattel
- Otto Königsberger, professor at the Development Planning Unit (DPU)
- CJ Lim, professor of architecture & urbanism
- Mariana Mazzucato, director of the UCL Institute for Innovation & Public Purpose (IIPP)
- Henrietta Moore, director of the Institute for Global Prosperity (IGP)
- Jane Rendell, professor of architecture and art
- Neba Sere, first director of Decolonising and Decarbonising and associate professor of architecture
