= British Safety Council =

Charitable organization in the occupational health and safety field

British Safety Council (BSC)
- Formation: 1957
- Type: Professional membership organisation
- Headquarters: London
- Location: Work Life. Kings House, 174 Hammersmith Road
- Members: Open to any interested person
- Official language: English
- Founder: James Tye
- Website: https://www.britsafe.org/

The British Safety Council, a registered charity founded by James Tye in 1957, is one of the world's leading health and safety organisations alongside the likes of Institution of Occupational Safety and Health and International Institute of Risk & Safety Management.

The British Safety Council covers a variety of health and safety issues such as occupational health and safety, construction health and safety, environmental sustainability, COSHH, risk assessment, fire safety and environmental management.

Unlike these the council's members are mostly companies. Safety practitioners the world over use the services and training they provide. The London-based charity provides training in over 50 countries.

The British Safety Council is also a partner in the development of the Occupational Safety and Health Consultants Register scheme (OSHCR), a centrally held register of registered health and safety consultants within the United Kingdom.

== The British Safety Council as a government awarding body ==
The British Safety Council was a government-regulated awarding body that complied with a wide range of conditions set by the regulator to maintain rigor and consistency in the awarding of qualifications. The British Safety Council has withdrawn its regulated qualifications.

They provide qualifications from international organizations, including NEBOSH, IEMA and IOSH.
