= Compensation culture =

Pejorative term

"Compensation culture" (often shortened to "compo culture") is a pejorative term used to imply that, within a society, a significant number of claims for compensation for torts are unjustified, frivolous, or fraudulent, and that those who seek compensation should be criticised. It is used to describe a "where there's blame, there's a claim" culture of litigiousness in which compensation is routinely and improperly sought without being based on the application of legal principles such as duty of care, negligence, or causation. Ronald Walker KC defined it as "an ethos [which believes that] all misfortunes short of an Act of God are probably someone else's fault, and that the suffering should be relieved, or at any rate marked, by the receipt of a sum of money."

The notion of a compensation culture has also been conflated with health and safety legislation and excessively risk-averse decisions taken by corporate bodies in an apparent effort to avoid the threat of litigation.

The phrase was coined in an article by Bernard Levin in London's The Times newspaper dated 17 December 1993. The article, largely a polemic against the welfare state, carried the sub-heading: "We may laugh at ludicrous court cases in America, but the compensation culture began in Britain and is costing us dear [sic]".

== Media myth ==
The term is especially used in tabloid journalism and by advocates of tort reform to describe a perceived legal climate with regard to torts in the United Kingdom and Ireland. Lord Dyson, the third most senior judge in England and Wales, has dismissed the existence of a compensation culture in the UK as a false perception and a "media-created myth." James Hand, writing in the Journal of Law and Society, observed that sensationalist stories about compensation awards "evidently make for good copy; national newspaper articles concerning the compensation culture have increased exponentially since the mid 1990s," while statistics conversely demonstrated "a broad decline" in the number of claims during the same period.

Research published in 2006 examined the data held by the Compensation Recovery Unit, a government agency which enabled the state to recover from tort damages any social security benefits paid as a result of an accident or disease. This found "no evidence that the tort system has been flooded with an increasing number of personal injury claims in recent years" and concluded that "the number of claims [had] been relatively stable since at least 1997–1998," the first year for which statistics were available. George Monbiot, a British writer and political activist, said: "Compensation culture has usurped political correctness, welfare cheats, single mothers and New Age travellers as the right's new bogeyman-in-chief. According to the Confederation of British Industry (CBI), the Conservative Party and just about every newspaper columnist in Britain, it threatens very soon to bankrupt the country."

A Better Regulation Commission (BRC) report published in 2004 concluded that there was no compensation culture in the UK, in part due to the fact that a lower portion of GDP was spent on tort claims than other similarly-placed countries including Canada, Australia and the United States. The commission also found that the myth of the compensation culture was largely perpetuated by the media. Janet Paraskeva, then The Law Society's chief executive, commented: "Ironically, it seems that those who most decry the possibility of a compensation culture are probably responsible for perpetuating the belief that there is one – resulting in more and more of the bizarre decisions by schools and local authorities that journalists are so quick to mock." One analyst put it more bluntly: "Loose talk of a 'compensation culture' no doubt helps to sell the very sorts of newspapers that purport to despise it most."

Levin's 1993 article related the details of several personal injury claims which had succeeded in the United States, and warnings of 'American-style litigiousness' arriving in the UK were common in many articles in the domestic media during the late 1990s. This coincided with vigorous lobbying in the United States by special interest groups and business organisations in support of product liability reform (often referred to as tort reform) to place restrictions on laws allowing consumers to sue companies for damages caused by faulty products.

== False perceptions and fear of litigation ==
Kevin Williams, writing in the Journal of Personal Injury Law, said: "The fact that there may be no objective proof that we live in an increasingly 'blame and sue' society is beside the point when an 'urban myth' to the contrary is said to have taken hold. Thus, whatever the actual likelihood of being the target of litigation, many increasingly believe themselves to be at heightened risk of being unfairly sued." The 2004 BRC report came to the same conclusion, stating that the myth of a compensation culture in the UK was "a commonly held perception" which created an exaggerated fear of litigation and led to organisations becoming excessively risk-averse and "over cautious in their behaviour." However, research commissioned by the Health and Safety Executive (HSE) in 2008 to assess "the extent to which disproportionate health and safety management occurs" found that "most organisations do not report the examples of excessive [health and safety management] quoted in the media" but still perceived "a problem with risk aversion" in the UK in general. This, according to Sally Lloyd-Bostock, a professor of Law and Psychology, demonstrated that even the "perceptions of the effects of perceptions" were not based on evidence but instead on what Marc Galanter, professor of Law at the University of Wisconsin–Madison, dubbed "anecdotes, atrocity stories and unverified assertions" perpetuated by the media.

Common Sense, Common Safety, a 2010 report by Lord Young of Graffham to the Prime Minister reviewing "health and safety laws and the growth of the compensation culture" also found "there is no end to the constant stream of misinformation in the media" and that the "overriding opinion" of the organisations questioned (including the Confederation of British Industry, the Trades Union Congress, Families Against Corporate Killers, the Police Federation of England and Wales and the International Institute of Risk and Safety Management) was that "the health and safety agenda had been hijacked by the tabloid press, whose reports often contributed to misinterpretation and misunderstandings by regularly exaggerating and ridiculing instances which in reality have little or nothing at all to do with health and safety." The "broad consensus" of these groups was that "they did not believe there was a growing compensation culture in the UK" but that there was a "public perception of one that stifles opportunities and leads business to take an overcautious attitude when attempting to interpret health and safety regulations in the workplace."

== See also ==
- Liebeck v. McDonald's Restaurants
- Loaded language
- Lobbying in the United Kingdom
- Politico-media complex
- Propaganda model
- Tort reform in the United States
