= Gratuitous care =

Gratuitous care is the term used in civil accident injury claims to describe the primary compensation for care provided by friends and family of the injured party. As the term implies, this is care that the injured party has not paid for, though the law recognizes that it has value, and can be sued for.

== Overview ==
A personal injury claim consists of two main sections: General damages and Special damages (see Damages), Gratuitous care is a head of claim that comes under Special damages. Special damages normally encompasses expenses that the injured party has paid for (for example taxi fares where he/she has not been able to drive to places as normal), or of monies he/she would have received but has not due to his/her injuries (for example loss of earnings). However, in the case of Gratuitous care the injured party can claim for the care and help he/she has received by friends and/or family even though he/she has probably not actually paid over any money. The law recognises that this care and help provided by friends and family is necessary and would otherwise need to be paid for, and therefore enables the injured party to claim just as he/she would have done if the care had been purchased from an outside agency.

== Compensation ==
Gratuitous can be claimed on an hourly basis on what is known as the gratuitous rate. This is based on what the care would have cost in any particular area if provided to the claimant by a commercial organisation, less the profit margin that organisation would make. This profit margin is generally taken to be about one third of the retail cost. So for example if the commercial cost of the care provided would have been £9 per hour, it can be claimed at £6 per hour.

Gratuitous care can be claimed on both a past and futures basis.

== See also ==
- Maximum medical improvement
- Common Sense, Common Safety
