= British Safety Industry Federation =

British trade association

The British Safety Industry Federation (BSIF) is the UK's leading trade body within the safety industry. As of 2024 it has some 400 members including manufacturers, distributors, test houses, certification bodies, safety professionals and service providers. Its CEO is Andy Murray.

The BSIF is a federation of seven independent trade associations:

- The BSIF Association of Safety Professionals
- The BSIF Safety Distributor Association
- The BSIF Environmental Safety Association
- The BSIF Occupational Health Association
- The BSIF Personal Safety Manufacturers Association [PSMA]
- The BSIF Test and Certification Association
- The BSIF Trade Body Forum

Its aim is to provide support and guidance on a wide range of occupational safety issues. The BSIF has active links with many government departments and over 130 representative trade bodies. It was a co-founder in 2012 of the Occupational Safety and Health Consultants Register, along with other bodies including the British Safety Council and the Health and Safety Executive.

The BSIF is the lead association for the Personal Protective Equipment (PPE) Directive and it is recognised as a Competent Authority by the Health and Safety Executive (HSE). After a member survey in 2024 revealed worn-out, substandard, and inadequate PPE, it called for renewed attention to PPE quality and planned to launch a PPE Saves Lives campaign in 2025.
