= Occupational Safety and Health Consultants Register =

British public register of consultants

Occupational Safety & Health Consultants Register
- Formation: 2011
- Type: Professional Consultants Register
- Location: OSHCR Ltd, PO Box 169, Redgrave Court, Liverpool, Merseyside L20 7WU. United Kingdom.
- Members: 1,183 (Mar-22)
- Official language: English
- Website: OSHCR

The Occupational Safety and Health Consultants Register (OSHCR) is a public register of UK-based occupational health and safety advice consultants, set up to assist UK employers and business owners with general advice on workplace health and safety issues. The register was established in response to the Government’s October 2010 report on 'Common Sense, Common Safety', which recommended that all health and safety consultants should be accredited to professional bodies and a web-based directory established.

== The register ==
The scheme is voluntary for individuals who provide commercial advice on general health and safety management issues. Consultants who are registered on OSHCR have been assessed by their professional body and have achieved a set standard based on their qualifications and experience. Each consultant must maintain their continuing professional development, abide by a code of conduct and be committed to giving sensible and proportionate advice to businesses. The reason for this is that many people did, and still do, set themselves up as 'experts when they have neither the qualifications nor the experience to advise vulnerable or unwary clients.

On launching the register Work and Pensions Minister Chris Grayling said "We have launched an official Occupational Safety and Health Consultants Register for those health and safety practitioners who are properly accredited to one of the professional bodies in the industry.".

Also at the launch in 2011, (Dame) Judith Hackitt (Chair of the Health & Safety Executive) said the register would provide "an independent way of demonstrating professional competence in occupational health and safety consultancy and should also encourage those who have not yet met these standards to do so." However in an interview with IOSH Magazine shortly before she left her post in April 2016, she said: "I don't think it has done what it set out to do at all."

In April 2021 the Institutution of Occupational Safety and Health (IOSH) announced that they had been asked to take on the Register as one of its companies, and help make it a more widely recognised source of competent, independent and proportionate OSH advice. They appointed Richard Orton, IOSH Director of Strategy and Business Development to the OSHCR board, until he left IOSH in January 2022, taking over as Managing Director at Certsure. He was replaced by Ruth Lake as IOSH's representative on the Board

== Services to business owners ==
Many businesses develop in-house competence to manage their health and safety risks and do not need to use health and safety consultants. Other employers however, may need additional help and the consultants registered on OSHCR will have a status recognised by the participating bodies in the OSHCR scheme.

The register enables businesses, once they have registered, to search for a consultant by geographical area, industry or topic, in order to enable them to find someone who will provide specific, tailored, advice relevant to their business needs.

== Eligibility ==
OSHCR has a webpage dedicated to eligibility standards. These criteria have been agreed by the network of professional bodies and stakeholders involved in developing the register. Only those consultants who meet the eligibility criteria can apply to join the register.

Part of the application procedure to join the register will involve a check with the relevant professional body that an individual has achieved a certain status within that professional body.

However, in summary consultants must have achieved at least one of the following:

1. Chartered status with:

- IOSH (Institution of Occupational Safety and Health);
- Chartered Member of the BPS (British Psychological Society);
- CIEH (Chartered Institute of Environmental Health); or
- REHIS (Royal Environmental Health Institute of Scotland) with health and safety qualifications

2. Fellow status with IIRSM (International Institute of Risk and Safety Management) with degree level qualifications

3. Charted Member or Charted Fellow of BOHS (British Occupational Hygiene Society) Faculty of Occupational Hygiene

4. Registered Member or Fellow status with CIEHF (Chartered Institute of Ergonomics and Human Factors).

In addition, all consultants wishing to join the register will be asked to declare that they will:

- Demonstrate adequate continuing professional development
- Abide by their professional body’s code of conduct;
- Provide sensible and proportionate advice; and
- Have professional indemnity insurance or equivalent to cover the nature of their duties.

== Participating bodies ==
The professional bodies and other stakeholders involved are:

- British Occupational Hygiene Society (BOHS)
- British Safety Council (BSC)
- British Safety Industry Federation (BSIF)
- Chartered Institute of Environmental Health (CIEH)
- Health and Safety Executive Northern Ireland (HSENI)
- Institute of Ergonomics and Human Factors (IEHF)
- International Institute of Risk & Safety Management (IIRSM)
- Institution of Occupational Safety and Health (IOSH)
- National Examination Board in Occupational Safety and Health (NEBOSH)
- Royal Environmental Health Institute of Scotland (REHIS)
- Royal Society for the Prevention of Accidents (ROSPA)
- Health and Safety Executive.
