= BSIF =

BSIF may refer to:

- Belize Social Investment Fund; see List of central government entities in Belize
- Bluefield Solar Income Fund, a British investment trust
- British Safety Industry Federation, a British organisation
- Office of the Superintendent of Financial Institutions, a Canadian government agency, Bureau du surintendant des institutions financières in French
