= Dissenter =

One who disagrees in matters of opinion, belief, practices etc

A dissenter (from the Latin dissentire, 'to disagree') is one who dissents (disagrees) in matters of opinion, belief, etc. Dissent may include political opposition to decrees, ideas or doctrines and it may include opposition to those things or the fiat of a government, political party or religion.

== Usage in Christianity ==
=== Dissent from the Anglican Church ===
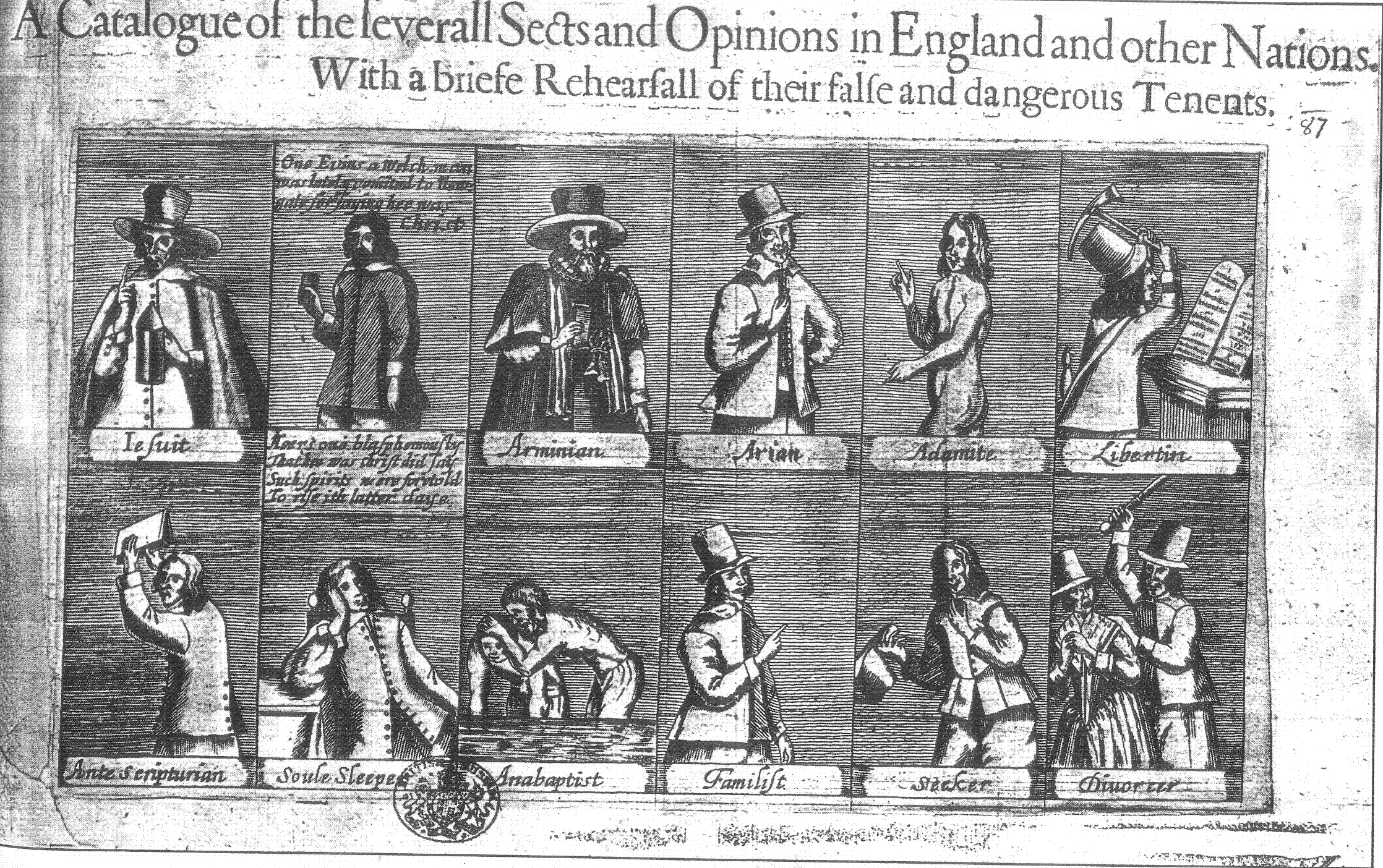
A Catalogue of the Severall Sects and Opinions in England and other Nations: With a briefe Rehearsall of their false and dangerous Tenents, a propaganda broadsheet denouncing English dissenters from 1647.

In the social and religious history of England and Wales, and, by extension, Ireland, however, it refers particularly to a member of a religious body who has, for one reason or another, separated from the established church or any other kind of Protestant who refuses to recognise the supremacy of the established church in areas where the established church is or was Anglican.

Originally, the term included English and Welsh Roman Catholics whom the original draft of the Nonconformist Relief Act 1779 styled "Protesting Catholic Dissenters". In practice, however, it designates Protestant Dissenters referred to in sec. ii. of the Act of Toleration 1689 (see English Dissenters). The term recusant, in contrast, came to refer to Roman Catholics rather than Protestant dissenters.

=== Dissent from the Presbyterian Church ===
The term has also been applied to those bodies who dissent from the Presbyterian Church of Scotland, which is the national church of Scotland. In this connotation, the terms dissenter and dissenting, which had acquired a somewhat contemptuous flavor, have tended since the middle of the 18th century to be replaced by nonconformist, a term which did not originally imply secession, but only refusal to conform in certain particulars (for example the wearing of the surplice), with the authorized usages of the established church.

== Dissent from state religion ==
Still more recently, the term nonconformist has in its turn, as the political attack on the principle of a state establishment of religion developed, tended to give way to the style of free churches and free churchman. All three terms continue in use, nonconformist being the most usual, as it is the most colourless.

== See also ==
- Christian anarchism
- Conventicle
- Dissident
- Freedom of religion
- Liberal Christianity
- Organizational dissent
- Protestant dissenting deputies
- Religion in the United Kingdom

Compare:

- Spiritual Christianity (dissenters from the Russian Orthodox Church)
