= National Examination Board in Occupational Safety and Health =

UK-based examination board

NEBOSH
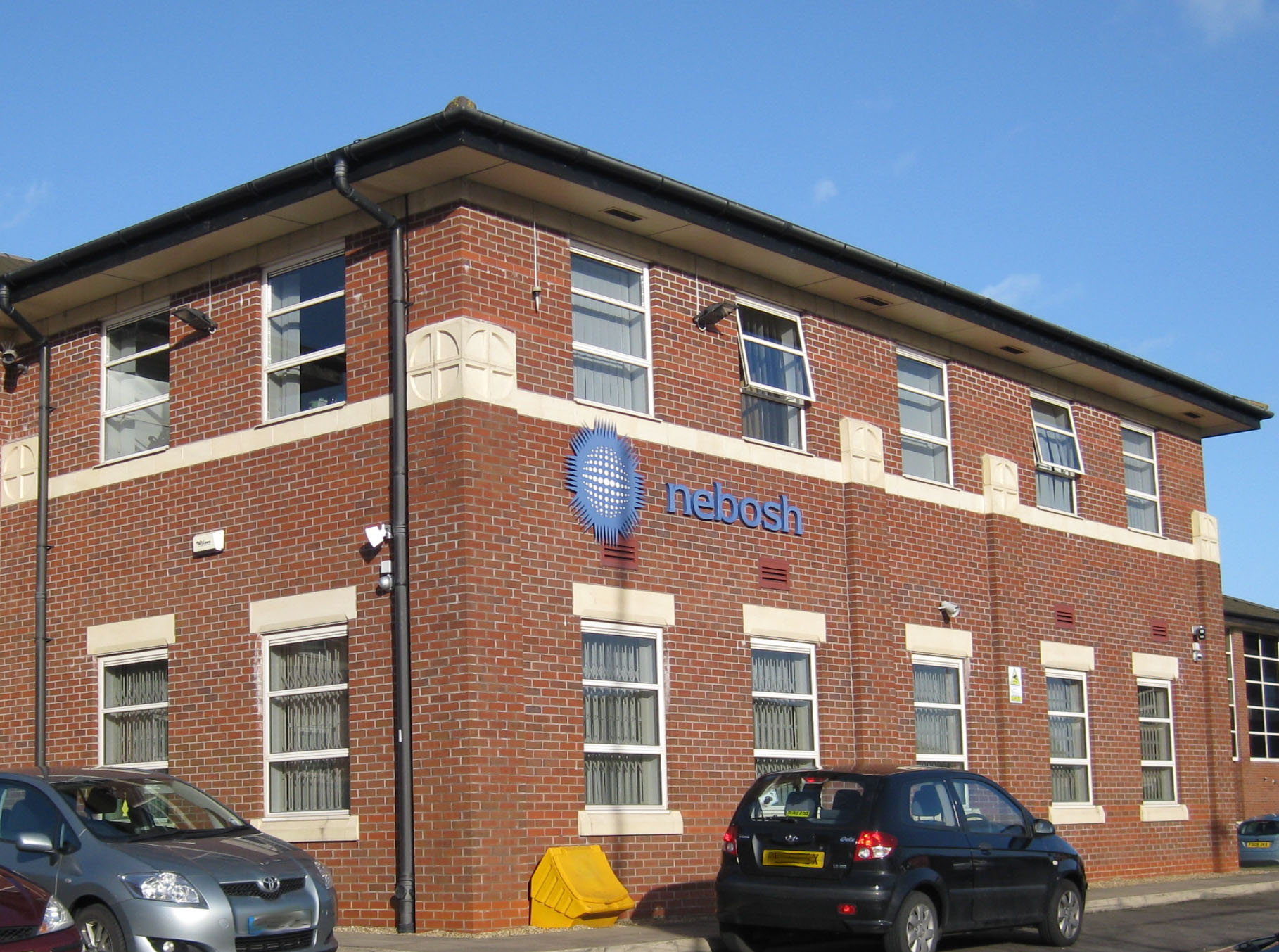
- NEBOSH head office
- Formation: 1979
- Type: Examination Board
- Legal status: Private company (2698100) and registered charity (1010444)
- Location: Meridian Business Park, Leicester, UK
- Chief Executive: Andy Shenstone
- Chair of the Board of Trustees: Rob Hull
- Website: www.nebosh.org.uk

The National Examination Board in Occupational Safety and Health (NEBOSH (/ˈniːbɒʃ/ NEE-bosh)) is a UK-based examination board offering qualifications in health, safety, environment and wellbeing management.

It was founded in 1979 and has charitable status. It offers a range of qualifications from introductory to professional level. Around 400,000 people worldwide held a NEBOSH qualification as of 2019.

Qualifications and courses are delivered by NEBOSH's network of approximately 600 accredited Learning Partners, which are located in countries around the world.

NEBOSH qualifications are recognised by relevant professional membership bodies including the Institution of Occupational Safety and Health (IOSH) and the International Institute of Risk and Safety Management (IIRSM).

In 2014, NEBOSH received the Queen's Award for Enterprise for Outstanding Achievement in International Trade.

== Background ==
The Health and Safety at Work etc. Act 1974 laid down general principles for the management of health and safety at work in Britain. This legislation, together with the establishment of the Health and Safety Executive (HSE) and Health and Safety Commission (HSC) (now merged), led to more emphasis being placed on occupational safety and health by UK employers from the mid-1970s onwards. As a result, the role of the health and safety officer and health and safety manager became more widespread in British workplaces.

To meet a need for the provision of vocational qualifications in the area of occupational safety and health, NEBOSH was established in September 1979, operating from the offices of IOSH in Leicester.

At the time, the NEBOSH board, led by founding chairman Professor Richard Booth, set out its primary objective: "To improve the quality & quantity of people with vocational qualifications in Occupational Safety and Health".

== History ==
The first NEBOSH Associate level and Member level examinations took place in June 1980. Candidates sat five papers; Law; Behavioural Science; Techniques of Safety Management; Occupational Health & Hygiene and General Science.

By October 1981, membership of the NEBOSH board had grown and included representatives from IOSH, UK government departments, various teaching establishments and the Royal Society for the Prevention of Accidents (RoSPA). Recognition of NEBOSH qualifications also began to grow around this time. In June 1982, 140 people registered for their NEBOSH Ordinary level certificate and 84 for the Higher level certificate. By 1986, NEBOSH had increased the number of annual examination sessions from two to three.

In February 1987, NEBOSH introduced a new qualification structure, which included a certificate and a diploma. In 1988 the diploma level qualification was changed to feature four 3-hour exams and completion of a case study. Candidates scoring over 75% achieved a distinction.

In the early 1990s, NEBOSH began to formally separate itself from IOSH. In March 1992, NEBOSH incorporated as a limited company with Companies House. In April 1992, NEBOSH registered as a charity with the Charity Commission and appointed its first chief executive, Martin Shuttleworth, two months later.

In December 1992, the NEBOSH Specialist Environmental Diploma was launched, followed shortly by the NEBOSH Construction Certificate. In June 1997 NEBOSH introduced a "credit mark" to demonstrate a high score in an exam – sitting just below a "distinction." The two-part diploma was introduced in June 1998.

NEBOSH moved its offices to Meridian Business Park, Leicester in 1999.

Stephen Vickers took up the position of NEBOSH Chief Executive in April 2000. Six months later the Qualifications and Curriculum Authority (QCA) – now The Office of the Qualifications and Examinations Regulator (Ofqual) accredited NEBOSH as an awarding body. In March 2001, designatory letters were introduced for holders of NEBOSH higher level awards.

In September 2001, almost 22 years after the formation of NEBOSH, Dolores Lavander of West Midlands Fire Service (WMFS) became the 50,000th NEBOSH examination candidate. A presentation to mark the occasion was held at WMFS headquarters.

Teresa Budworth took up the role of Chief Executive in March 2006. Two months later the first NEBOSH graduation ceremony took place at the University of Warwick. A further landmark was achieved in June 2006 when the 100,000th NEBOSH General Certificate was awarded to David Marsh.

In October 2006, NEBOSH moved offices to its current location of 5 Dominus Way, Meridian Business Park, Leicester. The new building was formally opened by the then Secretary of State for Health, Patricia Hewitt.

The NEBOSH Specialist Environmental Diploma was revised and renamed the NEBOSH Diploma in Environmental Management in September 2008.

In 2009, NEBOSH introduced two new qualifications – the NEBOSH International Diploma and the NEBOSH Environmental Certificate. In 2010, four more qualifications were launched – the NEBOSH Award in Health and Safety at Work, the NEBOSH Health and Well-being Certificate, the NEBOSH International Construction Certificate and the NEBOSH International Technical Certificate in Oil and Gas Operational Safety.

In 2011, NEBOSH as well as other UK and international professional bodies developed the scheme for the Occupational Safety & Health Consultants Register (OSHCR), a scheme which provides a centrally held register of qualified health and safety consultants for businesses and employers to easily find and hire for their own places of work.

In 2014, NEBOSH began offering a research-based master's degree jointly with the University of Hull, with the first degrees awarded in 2015. In 2015 a taught master's degree was developed with options to focus on one or more of the disciplines of occupational health, safety and environmental management.

In 2014, NEBOSH began working with the Health and Safety Executive (HSE) to offer a postgraduate-level qualification to new HSE Inspectors responsible for enforcement of safety law in the UK.

NEBOSH continued to develop its portfolio of qualifications. As of 2025, NEBOSH offers 30 qualifications. Its qualifications include those developed in partnership with the HSE and the University of Hull.

A number of NEBOSH qualifications are regulated by the Scottish Qualifications Authority. In May 2023 NEBOSH announced that regulation of the NEBOSH Level 6 National and International Diploma for Occupational Health and Safety Management Professionals had moved to Ofqual.

In March 2023 Andy Shenstone was appointed as NEBOSH's Chief Executive. In July 2023 Rob Hull was appointed as Chair of the NEBOSH Board.

== Qualifications and courses ==
There are four categories of NEBOSH qualification: award, certificate, diploma and master's degree. NEBOSH HSE qualifications are developed in collaboration with the UK's regulator, the Health and Safety Executive. NEBOSH IIRSM qualifications are developed in collaboration with the International Institute of Risk and Safety Management (IIRSM).

=== Awards ===
Award-level qualifications provide general understanding of health and safety principles and practice which is a useful introduction to higher level qualifications.

- NEBOSH Health and Safety at Work Award
- NEBOSH Environmental Awareness at Work Qualification
- NEBOSH HSE Introduction to Incident Investigation
- NEBOSH HSE Award in Managing Risks and Risk Assessment at Work
- Working with Wellbeing

=== Certificates ===
Certificate-level qualifications are a foundation for managers, supervisors and people at the start of a career in health and safety.

- NEBOSH National General Certificate in Occupational Health and Safety
- NEBOSH Health and Safety Management for Construction (UK)
- NEBOSH Environmental Management Certificate
- NEBOSH Certificate in Fire Safety
- NEBOSH International General Certificate in Occupational Health and Safety
- NEBOSH Health and Safety Management for Construction (International)
- NEBOSH International Technical Certificate in Oil and Gas Operational Safety
- NEBOSH HSE Certificate in Process Safety Management
- NEBOSH HSE Certificate in Health and Safety Leadership Excellence
- NEBOSH HSE Certificate in Manual Handling Risk Assessment
- NEBOSH HSE Certificate in Managing Stress at Work
- NEBOSH IIRSM Certificate in Managing Risk
- NEBOSH National Certificate in Protecting Standard Duty Premises from Terrorism
- NEBOSH National Certificate in Protecting Enhanced Duty Premises and Events from Terrorism
- NEBOSH International Certificate in Protecting Premises and Events from Terrorism

=== Diplomas ===
Diploma level qualifications demonstrate professional knowledge of the subjects covered

- NEBOSH Level 6 National Diploma for Occupational Health and Safety Management Professionals
- NEBOSH Level 6 International Diploma for Occupational Health and Safety Management Professionals
- NEBOSH National Diploma in Environmental Management
- NEBOSH International Diploma in Environmental Management

=== Master's degrees ===
Master's degrees are offered in partnership with the University of Hull and demonstrate higher-order learning.

NEBOSH offers three separate Master of Research (MRes) degrees in partnership with the University of Hull:

- MRes in Occupational Health, Safety and Environmental Management
- MRes in Occupational Health and Safety Management
- MRes in Environmental Management

NEBOSH offers three separate Master of Science (MSc) degrees in partnership with the University of Hull:

- MSc in Occupational Health, Safety and Environmental Management
- MSc in Occupational Health and Safety Management
- MSc in Environmental Management

== Accredited Learning Partners ==
There are more than 600 organisations worldwide delivering NEBOSH qualifications and courses.

NEBOSH Learning Partners must be accredited by NEBOSH. Accreditation is required for each separate qualification. The accreditation process ensures course providers have procedures and resources in place to deliver training programmes of a standard required by NEBOSH and to maintain the integrity of the assessment process.

Accredited NEBOSH Learning Partners not only deliver qualifications, but organise exam sittings for candidates. Accredited Learning Partners include educational establishments, commercial training and consultancy providers and large employers.

Through its network of Learning Partners NEBOSH qualifications have been taken in more than 170 countries throughout the world like including the United Kingdom, India, Pakistan, United Arab Emirates, South Africa, Nigeria, Australia, Canada, Singapore, Malaysia, Qatar, and Kuwait. It has five qualifications developed specifically for international study: NEBOSH International General Certificate in Occupational Health and Safety, NEBOSH Health and Safety Management for Construction (International), NEBOSH International Technical Certificate in Oil and Gas Operational Safety, the NEBOSH International Diploma for Occupational Health and Safety Management Professionals, and the NEBOSH International Diploma in Environmental Management. The ability of a manufacturer to use in-house NEBOSH-qualified staff reduces demand for external consultants, while the pool of qualified HSEQ professionals affects supplier power in the market.

As of 2020, the NEBOSH International General Certificate in Occupational Health and Safety is available in Arabic, English, French, Portuguese, Spanish and Turkish.

== Graduation ceremony and annual awards ==
Since 2006, candidates achieving a NEBOSH Diploma or Masters-level qualification have been invited to attend an annual graduation ceremony, which is regularly held at the University of Warwick. In June 2018, almost 800 guests attended this event to see Diplomates receive their diplomas, including 100 HSE inspectors.

Best Candidate awards are also presented at the annual ceremony to candidates achieving highest marks in the year for all certificate-level qualifications, diploma qualifications and for each separate unit of the NEBOSH National Diploma. These are acknowledged in the annual report.

== See also ==
- Occupational safety and health
- National Qualifications Framework
- Scottish Qualifications Authority
- Ofqual
