= Organizational dissent =

Disagreement within an organization

Organizational dissent is the "expression of disagreement or contradictory opinions about organizational practices and policies". Since dissent involves disagreement it can lead to conflict, which if not resolved, can lead to violence and struggle. As a result, many organizations send the message – verbally or nonverbally – that dissent is discouraged. However, recent studies have shown that dissent serves as an important monitoring force within organizations. Dissent can be a warning sign for employee dissatisfaction or organizational decline. Redding (1985) found that receptiveness to dissent allows for corrective feedback to monitor unethical and immoral behavior, impractical and ineffectual organizational practices and policies, poor and unfavorable decision making, and insensitivity to employees' workplace needs and desires. Furthermore, Eilerman argues that the hidden costs of silencing dissent include: wasted and lost time, reduced decision quality, emotional and relationship costs, and decreased job motivation. Perlow (2003) found that employee resentment can lead to a decrease in productivity and creativity which can result in the organization losing money, time, and resources.

== Types of dissent ==
There are three types of dissent: articulated, latent, and displaced (Kassing, 1998).

=== Articulated ===
Involves expressing dissent openly and clearly in a constructive fashion to members of an organization that can effectively influence organization adjustment. This may include supervisors, management, and corporate officers.

=== Latent ===
Employees resort to expressing dissent to either their coworkers or other ineffectual audiences within the organization. Employees employ this route when they desire to voice their opinions but lack sufficient avenues to effectively express themselves.

=== Displaced ===
Involves expressing dissent to external audiences, such as family and friends, rather than media or political sources sought out by whistle-blowers.

== Factors influencing dissent expression ==
Kassing (1997) states there are three factors that influence which dissent strategy an employee will decide to use:

1. Individual
2. Relational
3. Organizational

=== Individual influences ===
Individual influences concern qualities that employees bring to the organization, expectations they have acquired, and behaviors they enact within organizations.

=== Preference to avoid conflict ===
Roberto (2005) claims that employees may have a preference for avoiding conflict. Therefore, they find confrontation in a public setting uncomfortable. Individual's sense of powerlessness and senses of right and wrong are contributing factors (Kassing & Avtgis, 1999).

=== Verbal aggressiveness and argumentativeness ===
Kassing and Avtgis (1999) demonstrated that an individual's verbal aggressiveness and argumentativeness influence the manner in which an individual will approach expressing dissent. Verbal aggressiveness involves attacking another person's self concept. This may include character attacks, competence attacks, ridicule, and threats. Argumentativeness, on the other hand, is when an individual argues about controversial issues.

Individuals will choose their strategy for expressing dissent based on the strength of their arguments. Kassing and Avtgis (1999) found an individual who is more argumentative and less verbally aggressive is prone to use articulated dissent. On the other hand, an individual who lacks argumentative skills will resort to using a less direct and more aggressive strategy, latent dissent.

=== Work locus of control ===
Work locus of control can also be a contributing influence. An individual with an internal locus of control orientation believes that they have control over their destiny. They feel the only way to bring about a desired outcome is to act. Individuals who see their lives as being controlled by outside forces demonstrate an external locus of control (Robbins, 2005). Kassing's (2001) study demonstrated that employees with an internal locus of control used articulated dissent whereas an employee with an external locus of control preferred to use latent dissent.

=== Relational influences ===
Relational influences include the types and qualities of relationships people maintain within their organization.

Employee relationships
Employees develop and maintain various relationships within organizations. These relationships can influence the choices employees make about expressing dissent. Employees may feel uncomfortable voicing their dissenting opinions in the presence of others because they feel the best way to preserve relationships is to keep quiet. Homogeneous groups also place pressure on individuals to conform. Since many people fear being embarrassed in front of their peers, they can easily be lulled into consensus (Roberto, 2005).

Superior–subordinate relationship
The superior–subordinate relationship is an important relational factor. Employees who perceive they have a higher-quality relationship with their supervisors are more often to use articulated dissent. They feel their supervisors respect their opinions and that they have mutual influence and persuasion over the outcome of organizational decisions. Conversely, employees that perceive their relationship with their supervisor as low-quality will resort to latent dissent. They feel that there is no room to voice their opinions (Kassing, 2000).

Management which models the use of articulated dissent contributes to the use of articulated dissent among its employees (Kassing & Avtgis, 1999). Subordinates who witness their supervisors successfully articulating dissent may be more likely and more willing to adopt similar strategies. However, a supervisor must keep in mind that expressing dissent can be very difficult and uncomfortable for lower-level managers and employees. Therefore, supervisors should not only take actions to encourage dissent, they must be willing to seek out individuals willing to say no to them (Roberto, 2005).

=== Organizational influences ===
Organizational influences concern how organizations relate to their employees.

==== Organizational norms ====
Once an employee joins an organization, it is through assimilation that they learn the norms of the organization. Perlow (2003) states that organizations placing "high value on being polite and avoiding confrontation" can cause employees to be uncomfortable expressing their differences. Employees make assessments about motives and restraints when others dissent and use this knowledge to inform their own decisions about when and how to use dissent (Kassing, 2001). Furthermore, some corporate assumptions are accepted without questioning. For example, employees will defer to the expert's opinion (Roberto, 2005).

==== Organizational identification ====
Organizational identification and workplace freedom of speech has an effect on an individual's choice of expressing dissent (Kassing, 2000). If an individual highly identifies himself or herself with the organization, they are more likely to use the dissent strategy that mirrors the organization's values. If the organization demonstrates it values dissent and promotes workplace freedom of speech, the highly identified employee will demonstrate articulate dissent.

==== Openness ====
An organization that limits the opportunities for employees to voice their opinions, demonstrates contradictory expectations, and gives the perception that openness is not favored, will lead employees to select latent dissent strategies (Kassing & Avtgis, 1999).

== Perceptions of organizational dissenters ==
The perceptions of supervisors and coworkers can be used to further determine an individual's choice of dissent strategy. Employees will take notice of other dissenters and the consequences of their actions and will use this information to refine their "sense of organizational tolerance for dissent, to determine what issues merit dissent, and to inform their future dissent strategy choices" (Kassing, 2001).

Kassing (2001) found that articulated and latent dissenters were perceived differently. People perceived articulated dissenters to be more satisfied, more committed, possess higher quality relationships with their supervisors, and seen as employees who believed they have influence within their organizations than latent dissenters. Furthermore, articulated dissenters, compared to latent dissenters, were perceived to be less verbally aggressive.

== Triggering events ==
Organizational dissent begins with a triggering event. This triggering event is what propels individuals to speak out and share their opinions about organizational practices or politics. An individual will consider the issue of dissent and whom it concerns before deciding what dissent strategy to use. The types of issues that cause employees to dissent vary. The majority of employees expressed dissent due to resistance of organizational change. Other factors include employee treatment, decision making tactics, inefficiency, role/responsibility, resources, ethics, performance evaluations, and preventing harm (Kassing, 2002).

In addition to the dissent-triggering event, the focus of the issues can be relevant to how one expresses dissent. Kassing (2002) believed individuals may focus on improving matters within the organization that affect themselves (self-focused), they may focus on the welfare of the organization of the whole (other-focused) or they may focus on issues concerning their co-workers (neutral).

=== Articulated dissent ===
An individual will use upward articulate dissent in response to functional and other-focused dissent-triggering events. Organizations are more receptive to upward articulate dissenting when it is in regards to functional aspects. This type of dissent gives the perception that dissenters are being constructive and are concerned with issues of "principle rather than personal-advantage". It allows the employee to signal their commitment to cooperative goals.

=== Latent dissent ===
Individuals may also express latent dissent in response to functional and other-focused dissent-triggering. They determine to use latent instead of articulate when they believe that management is not receptive to employee dissent. This indicates that individuals would use articulate dissent if they feel those channels are not available and accessible. Latent dissent is also used in protective dissent–triggering events.

=== Displaced dissent ===
Individuals will readily use displaced dissent regardless of the focus or triggering event. External audiences provide individuals with a low-risk alternative to express dissent. The downfall for organizations, however, is the loss of employee feedback. If an employee expresses their dissent to outsiders, the organization will not hear about it and will assume that less dissent exists within the organization. When an organization fails to address potential issues, employees may then view the organization as discouraging dissent and will resort to using either latent or displaced dissent in the future.

== Benefits of upward dissent ==
In 2002, Kassing's research found upward dissent can be beneficial to both the organization and the individuals involved.

=== Organizational benefits ===
Upward dissent serves as an important monitoring force and allows the organization to identify problems and issues before they become damaging.

=== Individual benefits ===
Employees who express upward dissent seem more satisfied, to have better work relationships, and to identify with their organization.

== Upward dissent strategies ==
Not all organizations are designed to recognize and respond to employee dissent. Furthermore, employees consider expressing upward dissent as a "risky proposition". In several studies Kassing (1997, 1998) found that employees decided to express dissent by considering whether or not they will be perceived as constructive or adversarial, as well as the risk of retaliation associated with dissenting. In 2002, Kassing found that once an individual decides to strategically express dissent, they use five different categories: direct-factual appeal, repetition, solution presentation, circumvention, and threatening resignation.

=== Direct-factual appeal ===
When an employee uses factual information derived from physical evidence, knowledge of organizational policies and practices, and personal work experience, they use the direct-factual appeal strategy. This strategy is considered active and constructive because the employees seek evidence and base their assumptions on facts, evidence, and first-hand experience. Employees avoid using verbal attacks and unsupported data.

=== Repetition ===
Repetition involves expressing dissent about a topic/issue repeatedly at different points in time. This strategy is often used when an employee feels nothing is being done to correct the original articulated problem/issue and feel that the issue warrants being repeated. The problem with this strategy is that repetition in a short period can be seen as destructive. Especially if the abbreviated time frame does not allow the supervisor enough time to respond. However, if repetition is used over an extended time period it may be considered active–constructive since it may serve as a reminder to the supervisor.

=== Solution presentation strategy ===
The solution presentation strategy is deemed as active–constructive since an employee will provide solutions, with or without supporting evidence. This allows the supervisor to be receptive to the expressed dissent and indicates that effort has been put into solving the problem/issue.

=== Circumvention ===
If an employee feels their immediate supervisors are not responsive to dissent, they may employ the circumvention strategy. This entails the employee choosing to dissent to an audience higher in the organizational hierarchy. If an employee uses this strategy before giving their supervisor they opportunity to handle the situation first, this strategy can be deemed active–destructive. However, when used to express dissent regarding unethical practices it is considered active–constructive since the dissent is issue driven.

=== Threatening resignation ===
Threatening resignation can also be seen as both active–constructive and active–destructive. This strategy involves the employee threatening to resign as a "form of leverage for obtaining responsiveness and action from supervisors and management." When used to express your concerns about unsafe and intolerable work conditions it is deemed constructive. However, this strategy will appear to be destructive when the managers view the threat as "antagonistic and unprincipled".

== Encouraging dissent in the workplace ==
There are some "tricks" that leaders can utilize to develop their employees' attitudes, knowledge, and skills that are needed to foster constructive dissent.

=== Change decision-making focus ===
Leaders should focus on "How I should make the decision" instead of "What decision should I make". In the end, if they perform the following steps the decision the leader should make will be obvious.

=== Encourage constructive conflict ===
Leaders need to ensure that conflict remains constructive. That is, they must stimulate task-oriented disagreement and debate while trying to minimize interpersonal conflict. Eilerman (2006) claims that the way conflict is handled will determine whether the outcome is constructive or destructive. According to Roberto (2005) leaders can create constructive conflict by taking concrete steps before, during, and after a critical decision process.

=== Establish ground rules ===
Before the process begins, leaders can establish ground rules for how people should interact during the deliberations, clarify the role that each individual will play in the discussions, and build mutual respect. Asking individuals to role play or to become the devil's advocate ahead of time can help reduce affective conflict while also stimulating constructive conflict (Roberto, 2005). Macy and Neal (1995) claim that since the role of the devil's advocate is to present convincing counterarguments and to challenge the main position, its benefit lies in the fact that it automatically builds conflict into the decision-making process.

=== Intervene when necessary ===
During deliberations, leaders can intervene when debates get heated. They might redirect people's attention and frame the debate in a different light, redescribe the ideas and data in novel ways so as to enhance understanding and spark new branches of discussion or may revisit ideas in hopes of finding common ground (Roberto, 2005). Deutsch and Coleman (2000) explain that reframing allows conflicting parties to see themselves as being in a collaborative, while producing a positive atmosphere that is conductive to creativity and one that increases the potential solutions available.

=== Reflect on the process ===
After a decision process ends, leaders should reflect on the process and try to derive lessons learned regarding how to manage conflict constructively. Since reflections can lead to new insight, individuals must take time to critically assess the experience. They also must address and repair any hurt feelings and damaged relationships that may not have been apparent during the process itself. If these relationships are not repaired, trust could be lost which could negatively affect the effort of the next collaboration. Additionally, leaders should celebrate constructive conflict management and help others to remember the success of the process (Roberto, 2005).

=== Establish a supportive climate ===
Bennis (2004) emphasizes that corporate leaders must promise their followers that they will never be devalued or punished because they express dissent. All too often in the past, organizations would marginalize or terminate any employee who voiced an opposing view. Additionally, leaders should reward dissent and punish conflict avoiders. Anyone who clearly withholds a dissenting view only to obstruct the implementation later should be held responsible.

When leaders establish a climate of openness, they make constructive conflict a habit in the organization and develop behaviors which can be sustained over time. Kassing's (2000) research found that when leaders emphasize workplace freedom of speech, employees openly and clearly express dissent to audiences that are responsible for "organizational adjustment". However, for leaders to ensure this type of sustainability, they need to not only change the way they make decisions, but they must develop a pipeline of leaders who approach decision-making differently (Roberto, 2005).

== Situations that may undermine a leader's efforts ==
Even if a leader takes all the steps indicated above they must be aware of four situations that can undermine their efforts (Roberto, 2005).

=== Crowding out response time ===
Leaders should avoid crowding out opportunities to respond or discuss policies. Overloading an agenda can decrease the amount of time that is available for an individual to express their view.

=== Appointing the same devil's advocate every time ===
Employing the same person as devil's advocate can cause the view that it is an "empty ritual". It is seen as being done for procedural reasons instead of seeking dissenting views.

=== Allowing too much time for subgroups ===
Leaders should not allow employee subgroups to have too much time before coming together as a group. Doing so can cause the employees to become attached to an argument and as a result they may not be open to other ideas.

=== Focusing on qualitative data ===
Leaders should avoid focusing on qualitative data. The employees may become more focused on the data than the real issue(s).

== Whistle-blowing ==
Whistle-blowing is a subset of dissent. It involves the expression of dissent to external organizations such as media and political avenues that have the power to take corrective action. Kassing (2000) believes that the whistle-blowing process begins at the superior–subordinate relationship. If a superior response to an employee's effort to dissent is negative this may cause the employee to seek other avenues of dissent. In fact, evidence indicates that only as a last resort do the dissendents finally go public with their tales (Bennis, 2004, Kassing, 2000).

Whistle-blowers are often high-performing employees who believe they are doing their job (Martin, 2005). They just want to bring people's attention to a problem that is potentially harmful or unethical. Despite this, whistle-blowers are perceived negatively and suffer grave consequences. They are often ostracized, harassed, and attacked by their superiors and coworkers. They face termination, financial losses, stress, relationship breakdown, and health problems. Even worse, few whistle-blowers seem to bring about any change. The organization seems to put all their efforts into destroying the whistle-blower while ignoring the original problem. The organization will take great measures to cover-up the problem, devalue the target, reinterpret the events, and intimidate and/or bribe the whistle-blowers (Martin, 2005).

Organizations need to realize that internal dissent is not itself a crisis, but rather priceless insurance against disaster. Until the ugly headlines appear and the consequences are unavoidable, companies too often forget that they will suffer far more for ignoring their principled dissendents than by giving them a hearing (Bennis, 2004).

== See also ==
- Conflict management
- Dissent
- Dissenter
- Groupthink
- Human resources
- Succession planning
- Organizational communication
- Organizational conflict
- Organizational effectiveness
- Organizational learning
- Organizational studies
- Professional development
- Workplace democracy
