= Common Sense, Common Safety =

2010 UK government report

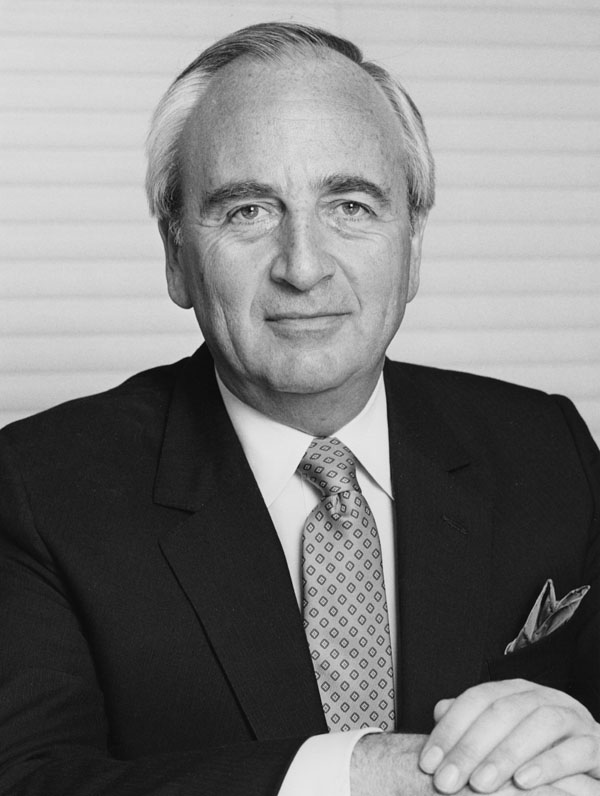
David Young, Baron Young of Graffham, pictured in 2010

Common Sense, Common Safety (also known as the Young Report) was an October 2010 report by David Young, Baron Young of Graffham. It was commissioned by the British government to address a perceived compensation culture. The report made a number of recommendations to reduce bureaucracy over risk assessment requirements and to improve accountability of decisions made on health and safety grounds by local authorities. Young also recommended reform in the legal processes for personal injury claims and for limits to be placed on claims management companies.

== Background ==
Common Sense, Common Safety was commissioned from David Young, Baron Young of Graffham by the British government and published in October 2010. It was an attempt by the government to address a perceived compensation culture in the United Kingdom. The British government of this period has been described as being pre-occupied with this matter and had previously implemented measures such as the Compensation Act 2006 to address it.

The media of this period were criticised for over-sensationalising events and activities that had been banned on health and safety grounds. Young's report cited a number examples of "health and safety hysteria in the media" including a report that claimed police officers had been prevented from diving into water to try to save drowning persons and a circus clown who, it was claimed, was banned from wearing oversized shoes during his act.

== Findings ==
Young made a series of recommendations that attempted to make sure health and safety was taken seriously whilst minimising the burden placed on small businesses. He recommended that the risk assessment process be simplified for low-hazard workplaces such as offices and shops and that the Health and Safety Executive make available a template to be used by such employers. He also recommended that many self-employed persons, working in low-hazard environments, and those that work from home be exempted from the requirement to carry out risk assessments.

Young also recommended that a standardised level of qualification was required for people practising as health and safety consultants and that a register be kept of such persons. He requested that insurance companies cease to specify that a consultant be employed to carry out a risk assessment in low-hazard workplaces. He made a number of recommendations for the educational sector as he thought the current process was too complicated and deterred teachers from taking children on trips out of school. He recommended that schools move away from risk assessments to risk-benefit assessments that take into account the benefits provided by play and leisure activities.

To address local authorities banning events on health and safety grounds Young recommended that they be required to record their specific reasons in writing and that they carry out an internal review of all such decisions. The report also recommended that a process be instituted by which citizens could refer decisions made by local authorities to an ombudsman who would review the decision within a fortnight.

In the legal field Young called for a simpler claims procedure to be implemented for personal injury (and possibly low-value medical negligence) claims, similar to one previously introduced to deal with road traffic claims. He also recommended that Lord Justice Rupert Jackson's Review of Civil Litigation Costs be implemented in full. Young requested that the work of claims management companies and referral agencies be restricted and the quantity of their advertisements limited. He also recommended that the government issue formal clarification that people will not be held responsible for the consequences of any well-intentioned actions.

== Impact ==
David Cameron, British prime minister in 2010

The report received media attention after its publication and recently elected prime minister David Cameron stated that his cabinet accepted all of Young's recommendations. Construction union, UCATT, criticised Young for "belittling workplace safety" in one of his addresses in the House of Lords. Young was forced to resign as government health and safety and enterprise adviser by the end of 2010 over the matter. In response to Young's report the Health and Safety Executive set up a working group to spearhead the implementation of the report's recommendations for the education sector.

David Cameron referenced the report in 2012 which he stated would be the year in which the government "kills off the health and safety culture for good". In April that year the Reporting of Injuries, Diseases and Dangerous Occurrences Regulations were amended to relax the requirement for reporting to only apply to injuries that prevented an employee from carrying out their usual work for seven days.
