= Professional development =

Learning to earn or maintain professional credentials

Professional development, also known as professional education, is learning that leads to or emphasizes education in a specific professional career field or builds practical job applicable skills emphasizing praxis in addition to the transferable skills and theoretical academic knowledge found in traditional liberal arts and pure sciences education. It is used to earn or maintain professional credentials such as professional certifications or academic degrees through formal coursework at institutions known as professional schools, or attending conferences and informal learning opportunities to strengthen or gain new skills.

Professional education has been described as intensive and collaborative, ideally incorporating an evaluative stage. There is a variety of approaches to professional development or professional education, including consultation, coaching, communities of practice, lesson study, case study, capstone project, mentoring, reflective supervision and technical assistance.

== Participants ==
A wide variety of people, such as teachers, military officers and non-commissioned officers, health care professionals, architects, lawyers, accountants and engineers engage in professional development. Individuals may participate in professional development because of an interest in lifelong learning, a sense of moral obligation, to maintain and improve professional competence, to enhance career progression, to keep abreast of new technology and practices, or to comply with professional regulatory requirements.

In the training of school staff in the United States, "[t]he need for professional development ... came to the forefront in the 1960s". Many American states have professional development requirements for school teachers. For example, Arkansas teachers must complete 60 hours of documented professional development activities annually. Professional development credits are named differently from state to state. For example, teachers in Indiana are required to earn 90 Continuing Renewal Units (CRUs) per year; in Massachusetts, teachers need 150 Professional Development Points (PDPs); and in Georgia, teachers must earn 10 Professional Learning Units (PLUs).

American and Canadian nurses, as well as those in the United Kingdom, have to participate in formal and informal professional development (earning credit based on attendance of education that has been accredited by a regulatory agency) in order to maintain professional registration.

== Professional schools ==
A professional school is a constituent college, academic department, or university program that prepares students, through praxis, for careers in specific fields. Most professional schools are chiefly but not exclusively graduate school level institution, while in some cases universities at the undergraduate level, especially at research universities where research, graduate, and undergraduate faculty overlap and/or have close cooperation with each other, may have a professional development emphasis in their education programs.

Most professional schools confer professional degrees although not all degree programs at professional schools are considered professional degrees because, professional degrees, in addition to standard first-level academic accreditation requirements conferred by a regional accreditation body, have to go through secondary or tertiary institutional or program accreditation procedures specifically designated by professional associations of industry experts.

== Approaches ==
In a broad sense, professional development may include formal types of vocational education, typically post-secondary or poly-technical training leading to qualification or credential required to obtain or retain employment. Professional development may also come in the form of pre-service or in-service professional development programs. These programs may be formal, or informal, group or individualized. Individuals may pursue professional development independently, or programs may be offered by human resource departments. Professional development on the job may develop or enhance process skills, sometimes referred to as leadership skills, as well as task skills. Some examples for process skills are 'effectiveness skills', 'team functioning skills', and 'systems thinking skills'. The use of CPD for the development of skills has been collaboratively joined with schemes for professional bodies. Like in Ireland the CPD certificates can be 'traded in' for Extra Personal Vacation days (EPV days) and are provided by various bodies like Actualise Academy. They run a service of online courses which teach special education-focused skills for the upcoming demands of these skills in Ireland's population.

Professional development opportunities can range from a single workshop to a semester-long academic course, to services offered by a medley of different professional development providers and varying widely with respect to the philosophy, content, and format of the learning experiences. Some examples of approaches to professional development include:

- Case study method – The case method is a teaching approach that consists in presenting the students with a case, putting them in the role of a decision maker facing a problem (Hammond 1976) – See Case method.
- Consultation – to assist an individual or group of individuals to clarify and address immediate concerns by following a systematic problem-solving process.
- Coaching – to enhance a person's competencies in a specific skill area by providing a process of observation, reflection, and action.
- Community of practice – to improve professional practice by engaging in shared inquiry and learning with people who have a common goal
- Lesson study – to solve practical dilemmas related to intervention or instruction through participation with other professionals in systematically examining practice
- Mentoring – to promote an individual's awareness and refinement of his or her own professional development by providing and recommending structured opportunities for reflection and observation
- Reflective supervision – to support, develop, and ultimately evaluate the performance of employees through a process of inquiry that encourages their understanding and articulation of the rationale for their own practices
- Technical assistance – to assist individuals and their organization to improve by offering resources and information, supporting networking and change efforts.

The World Bank's 2019 World Development Report on the future of work argues that professional development opportunities for those both in and out of work, such as flexible learning opportunities at universities and adult learning programs, enable labor markets to adjust to the future of work.

== Initial ==
Initial professional development (IPD) is a period of development during which an individual acquires a level of competence necessary in order to operate as an autonomous professional. Professional associations may recognise the successful completion of IPD by the award of chartered or similar status. Examples of professional bodies that require IPD prior to the award of professional status are the Institute of Mathematics and its Applications, the Institution of Structural Engineers, and the Institution of Occupational Safety and Health.

== Continuing ==
Continuing professional development (CPD) or continuing professional education (CPE) is continuing education to maintain knowledge and skills. Most professions have CPD obligations. Examples are the Royal Institution of Chartered Surveyors, American Academy of Financial Management, safety professionals with the International Institute of Risk & Safety Management (IIRSM) or the Institution of Occupational Safety and Health (IOSH), and medical and legal professionals, who are subject to continuing medical education or continuing legal education requirements, which vary by jurisdiction.

CPD authorities in the United Kingdom include the CPD Standards Office who work in partnership with the CPD Institute, and also the CPD Certification Service. For example, CPD by the Institute of Highway Engineers is approved by the CPD Standards Office, and CPD by the Chartered Institution of Highways and Transportation is approved by the CPD Certification Service.

In Australia, continuing professional development for registered health practitioners is overseen by the Australian Health Practitioner Regulation Agency (Ahpra) and the National Boards, which set profession-specific CPD registration standards. Delivery of CPD is supported by education providers; for example, Ausmed is identified by the Department of Veterans' Affairs as a provider of CPD education for nurses and personal care workers, and Healthdirect (the government-funded national health information service) profiles Ausmed's role in supplying CPD resources to the healthcare workforce.

A systematic review published in 2019 by the Campbell Collaboration found little evidence of the effectiveness of continuing professional development (CPD).

== See also ==
- Apprenticeship – Training for trades
- Career – Individual's journey through learning, work, and other aspects of life
- Core competency – Management concept of identifying the basis of competitiveness in an industry
- Induction training – Introduction to an organisation for new employees
- Licensure – Form of government regulation on professions or vocations for compensation
- Mentor – Guidance relationship
- Organizational dissent
- Reflective practice – Ability to reflect on one's actions so as to engage in a process of continuous learning
- Training and development – Improving the effectiveness of organizations and the individuals and teams within them
- Vocational education – Studies that prepare a person for a specific occupation
- Arete (moral virtue) – Greek philosophical concept
- SWOT analysis – Business planning and analysis technique
