= Health and Safety Executive for Northern Ireland =

Health body in Northern Ireland

Non-departmental public body overview
- Formed: 1978
- Headquarters: 83 Ladas Drive, Belfast
- Website: www.hseni.gov.uk

The Health and Safety Executive for Northern Ireland (HSENI) is a Northern Ireland non-departmental public body sponsored by the Department for the Economy.

It is responsible for the encouragement, regulation and enforcement of occupational health and safety in Northern Ireland. It is able to inspect farms, production sites, bonfire sites, and other sites.

Its functions are similar to those of the Health and Safety Executive in the rest of the United Kingdom. The HSENI employs approximately 105 staff.

It was founded as the Health and Safety Agency for Northern Ireland when the provisions of the Health and Safety at Work etc. Act 1974 were extended to Northern Ireland through the Health and Safety at Work (Northern Ireland) Order 1978 in 1978. It was renamed to use the term "Executive" in 1998, with the new agency in operation from 1 April 1999.

The Health and Safety Executive for Northern Ireland, along with the Health and Safety Executive have both been involved as partners of the Occupational Safety & Health Consultants Register (OSHCR), a consultants register set up by UK government to list registered health and safety consultants for businesses and employers.
