= Dissent =

Non-agreement or opposition to authority

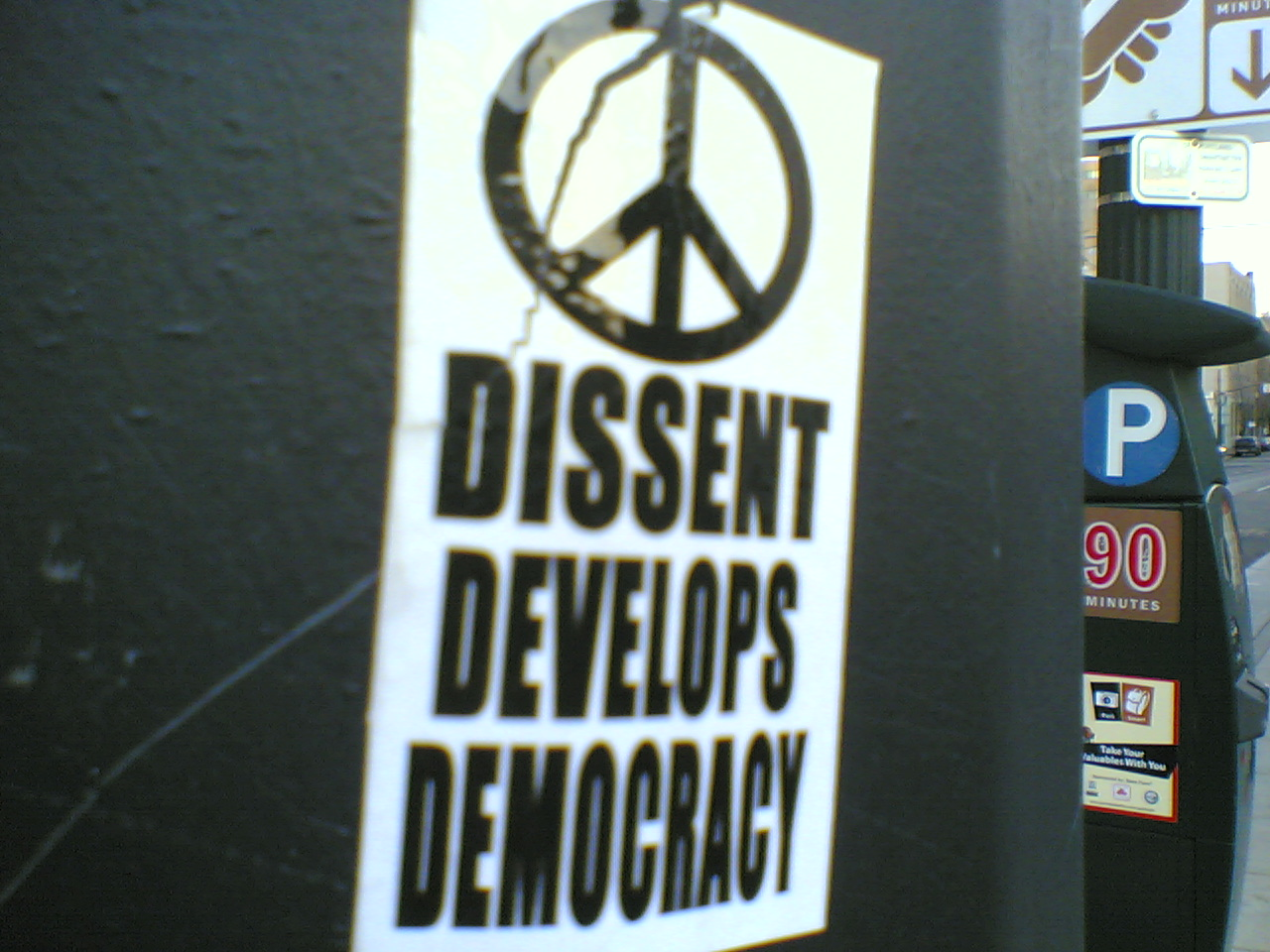
Sticker art arguing that dissent is necessary for democracy.

Dissent is an opinion, philosophy or sentiment of non-agreement or opposition to a prevailing idea or policy enforced under the authority of a government, political party or other entity. A dissenting person may be referred to as a dissenter.

== Philosophical ==
In philosophical skepticism, particularly that of Pyrrhonism, the existence of dissent is a rationale for suspending judgment regarding the issue associated with the dissent. Dissent in this respect appears as one of the tropes in the Five Modes of Agrippa, pointing to the uncertainty demonstrated by the differences of opinions among philosophers and people in general.

== Political ==
Political dissent is a dissatisfaction with or opposition to the policies of a governing body. Expressions of dissent may take forms from vocal disagreement to civil disobedience to the use of violence. In some political systems, dissent may be formally expressed by way of opposition politics, while politically repressive regimes may prohibit any form of dissent, leading to suppression of dissent and the encouragement of social or political activism. Individuals who do not conform or support the policies of certain states are known as "dissidents". Several thinkers have argued that a healthy society needs not only to protect, but also to encourage dissent.

== Religious ==
=== Heresy ===
Heresy is any belief or theory that is strongly at variance with established beliefs or customs, in particular the accepted beliefs of a church or religious organization. A heretic is a proponent of such claims or beliefs. Heresy is distinct from both apostasy, which is the explicit renunciation of one's religion, principles or cause, and blasphemy, which is an impious utterance or action concerning God or sacred things.

The term is usually used to refer to violations of important religious teachings, but is used also of views strongly opposed to any generally accepted ideas. It is used in particular in reference to Christianity, Judaism, and Islam.

=== Schism ===
A schism is a division between people, usually belonging to an organization, movement, or religious denomination. The word is most frequently applied to a split in what had previously been a single religious body, such as the East–West Schism or the Great Western Schism. It is also used of a split within a non-religious organization or movement or, more broadly, of a separation between two or more people, be it brothers, friends, lovers, etc.

A schismatic is a person who creates or incites schism in an organization or who is a member of a splinter group. Schismatic as an adjective means pertaining to a schism or schisms, or to those ideas, policies, etc. that are thought to lead towards or promote schism.

In religion, the charge of schism is distinguished from that of heresy, since the offence of schism concerns not differences of belief or doctrine but promotion of, or the state of, division. However, schisms frequently involve mutual accusations of heresy. In Roman Catholic teaching, every heresy is a schism, while there may be some schisms free of the added guilt of heresy. Liberal Protestantism, however, has often preferred heresy over schism. Presbyterian scholar James I. McCord (quoted with approval by the Episcopalian Bishop of Virginia Peter Lee) drew a distinction between them, teaching: "If you must make a choice between heresy and schism, always choose heresy. As a schismatic, you have torn and divided the body of Christ. Choose heresy every time."

== Military ==
Officers and enlisted personnel regularly take an oral oath to support and defend the primary convening document (i.e. constitution, articles of confederation, ruling laws and statutes) and/or the supreme leader of the nation-state. There have been countless cases throughout human history where commissioned military officers and enlisted personnel—as individuals or small groups—have chosen to question and disobey the orders of their superior officers or the supreme leader of the state. Dissent by military officers falls into two main categories: violent and non-violent. In essence, when a military officer, military leader chooses to oppose the orders given to them by their superior officers or national leader, they must decide whether their counter-action will be violent or non-violent in nature and in aim.

== Judicial ==
A dissenting opinion (or dissent) is an opinion in a legal case in certain legal systems written by one or more judges expressing disagreement with the majority opinion of the court which gives rise to its judgment. When not necessarily referring to a legal decision, this can also be referred to as a minority report.

Dissenting opinions are normally written at the same time as the majority opinion and any concurring opinions, and are also delivered and published at the same time. A dissenting opinion does not create binding precedent nor does it become a part of case law. Even though they can sometimes be cited as a form of persuasive authority in subsequent cases when arguing that the court's holding should be limited or overturned. In some cases, a previous dissent is used to spur a change in the law, and a later case may result in a majority opinion adopting a particular understanding of the law formerly advocated in dissent. As with concurring opinions, the difference in opinion between dissents and majority opinions can often illuminate the precise holding of the majority opinion.

== Scientific ==
Scientific dissent is dissent from scientific consensus. Disagreements can be useful for finding problems in underlying assumptions, methodologies, and reasoning, as well as for generating and testing new ways of tackling the unknown. In modern times, with the increased role of science on the society and the politicization of science, a new aspect gained prominence: effects of scientific dissent on public policies.

Scientific dissent is distinct from denialism, which is a deliberate rejection of scientific consensus usually for commercial or ideological reasons.

== Organizational ==
Organizational dissent is the "expression of disagreement or contradictory opinions about organizational practices and policies". Since dissent involves disagreement it can lead to conflict, which if not resolved, can lead to violence and struggle. As a result, many organizations send the message – verbally or nonverbally – that dissent is discouraged. However, recent studies have shown that dissent serves as an important monitoring force within organizations. Dissent can be a warning sign for employee dissatisfaction or organizational decline. Redding (1985) found that receptiveness to dissent allows for corrective feedback to monitor unethical and immoral behavior, impractical and ineffectual organizational practices and policies, poor and unfavorable decision making, and insensitivity to employees' workplace needs and desires. Furthermore, Eilerman argues that the hidden costs of silencing dissent include: wasted and lost time, reduced decision quality, emotional and relationship costs, and decreased job motivation. Perlow (2003) found that employee resentment can lead to a decrease in productivity and creativity which can result in the organization losing money, time, and resources.

== See also ==
- Dissident
- Eccentricity (behavior)
- Insubordination
- Palmer Raids
