= Review of Civil Litigation Costs =

The Review of Civil Litigation Costs, or Jackson Review or Jackson Proposals, is a review of civil litigation costs in England and Wales conducted by Lord Justice Jackson in 2009. The review's final report, known as the Jackson Report, was presented in January 2010.

== History ==
The senior judiciary were concerned about the cost of civil justice in England and Wales, in particular because the costs were often disproportionate to the issues, and in late 2008 the Master of the Rolls, Lord Clarke of Stone-cum-Ebony, asked Lord Justice Jackson to conduct a review into civil litigation costs. The review became known as the Jackson Review.

It commenced in January 2009 and took about a year to complete, a preliminary report being published on 8 May 2009. On 14 January 2010, Jackson presented the final report to the new Master of the Rolls, Lord Neuberger.

== Assessors ==
Jackson was assisted in his work by a panel of assessors, comprising:

- Mr Justice Cranston
- Professor Paul Fenn, Head of Industrial Economics at Nottingham University Business School
- Senior Costs Judge Master Peter Hurst
- Jeremy Morgan QC
- Michael Napier QC
- Andrew Parker (who replaced Lord Hunt, who had to resign early in the review for health reasons)
- Colin Stutt, Head of Funding at the Legal Services Commission

== Findings ==
The final report is 557 pages long.

The main findings and recommendations include:

- The costs system should be based on legal expenses that reflect the nature/complexity of the case.
- Success fees and after the event insurance premiums should not be recoverable in no win, no fee cases.
- General damages awards for personal injuries and other civil wrongs should be increased by 10%.
- Referral fees should be scrapped.
- Claimants should only make a small contribution to defendants' costs if a claim is unsuccessful (as long as they have behaved reasonably).
- There should be fixed costs for "fast track" cases (with a claim up to £25,000).
- A Costs Council should be established to annually review fixed costs and lawyers' hourly rates.
- Lawyers should be allowed to enter into Contingency Fee Agreements.
- "Before the event" legal insurance should be promoted.

== Follow-up ==
After the Jackson Report was published, the Judicial Executive Board agreed to support the recommendations of the final report and established a Judicial Steering Group with the following members:

- Lord Neuberger, Master of the Rolls
- Lord Justice Kay, Chairman of the Judicial Studies Board
- Lord Justice Moore-Bick, Deputy Head of Civil Justice

== Implementation ==
Reforms to civil costs were implemented in the Legal Aid, Sentencing and Punishment of Offenders Act 2012, which came into effect on 1 April 2013. Part 2 of the Act covered the implementation of recommendations 7, 9, 14 and 94 of the final report. Recommendations 10 and 65(i), concerned with a 10% general increase in damages in most tort cases, were carried forward in an Appeal Court ruling, in the case of Christopher Simmons v Derek Castle, and also took effect from 1 April 2013. This mode of implementation for damages was adopted in order to maintain the principle set out by Lord Diplock in Wright v British Railways Board in 1983 that "the Court of Appeal ... is 'generally speaking, the tribunal best qualified to set guidelines for judges trying such actions, particularly as respects non-economic loss'".

In 2015, two years after implementation, Jackson reflected that "the first and most important conclusion to be drawn from the experience of the last two years is the same as that which was drawn from the pilots: costs management works.
