= Rupert Jackson =

British judge (born 1948)

The Right Honourable Sir Rupert Jackson

Lord Justice of Appeal
- In office 11 November 2008 – 7 March 2018
- Preceded by: Sir Igor Judge

Personal details
- Born: 7 March 1948 (age 78)

Sir Rupert Matthew Jackson, PC (born 7 March 1948) is a retired justice of the Court of Appeal of England and Wales. Currently he serves as a Justice of the Astana International Financial Centre Court.

== Career ==
Jackson was educated at Christ's Hospital and Jesus College, Cambridge, of which he is an Honorary Fellow. As an undergraduate, he served as President of the Cambridge Union. He was called to the Bar in 1972 (Middle Temple) and made a Bencher in 1995. He became a Queen's Counsel in 1987, practising from 4 New Square Chambers. Jackson was a Recorder from 1990 until 1998, and was appointed a Deputy High Court Judge in 1993.

In 1999, he was appointed a Judge of the High Court of Justice and assigned to the Queen's Bench Division and was knighted the same year. He later served as the judge in charge of the Technology and Construction Court from 2004 to 2007. On 2 October 2008, Jackson was appointed a Lord Justice of Appeal, and he received the customary appointment to the Privy Council the same year. On 14 June 2017 he was made an Honorary Fellow of The Academy of Experts in recognition of his contribution and work for the Academy.

Jackson was, with John L. Powell, an author of a leading textbook on the English law of professional liability, Jackson & Powell on Professional Liability, published by Sweet & Maxwell.

He lives in Surrey and is married to Claire, Lady Jackson, a prominent local solicitor, who is head of the Wills, Trusts and Estates department of Howell-Jones LLP.

Following his retirement from the Court of Appeal, Sir Rupert Jackson was appointed a Justice of the Astana International Financial Centre (AIFC) Court in Astana, Kazakhstan, in 2018.

The AIFC Court is an independent commercial court and separable from the judicial system of the Republic of Kazakhstan. It is presided over by the Rt. Hon. The Lord Burnett of Maldon, one of the leading judicial figures in the UK.

== Review of civil costs ==
With the support of the Ministry of Justice, the Master of the Rolls, Sir Anthony Clarke, asked Lord Justice Jackson to conduct a review of civil litigation costs. Aims include carrying out an independent review of the rules governing the costs of civil litigation and to provide recommendations in order to promote access to justice at proportionate cost.

The review commenced in January 2009 and the findings were presented in January 2010. Many of the resulting reforms were implemented as part of the Legal Aid, Sentencing and Punishment of Offenders Act 2012 (LASPO) in April 2013.
