= Families Against Corporate Killers =

Nonprofit organization

Families Against Corporate Killers (FACK) is a nonprofit organisation based in the UK which campaigns on behalf of families bereaved by workplace deaths. It was founded in July 2006 by members of the Bereaved by Work North West support group and the Greater Manchester Hazards Centre. The organisation campaigns for increased funding for the enforcement of health and safety law and changes to the Corporate Manslaughter and Corporate Homicide Act 2007 - which currently only imposes financial penalties - to make directors criminally responsible for health and safety offences with the possibility of imprisonment. Co-founder Hilda Palmer said: "Fines alone are an insufficient penalty for taking a life." FACK also lobbies for the introduction of juries at all work-related inquests in England and Wales. They also provide guidance for bereaved families to obtain legal help and emotional support.

The organisation has submitted evidence to both the English and Scottish parliaments, and in July 2011 met with Professor Ragnar Löfstedt as part of a government review of health and safety legislation ordered by Chris Grayling MP, Minister of State in the Department for Work and Pensions. The review was held under the "removing burdens on business" agenda, a position the organisation opposed by stating that "victims of employers' crimes pay the price for employers' negligence rather than business bearing the burden." The independent health and safety journal Hazards described the review as "not really about changing the law. It's about risk envy – our competitors in China and Bangladesh don't all abide by strict rules governing safety, the environment and decency at work, so why should the UK?"
