= Institution of Occupational Safety and Health =

International professional organisation

- Formation: 1945
- Type: Professional Membership Organisation
- Headquarters: The Grange
- Location: Highfield Drive, Wigston, Leicestershire, LE18 1NN, United Kingdom
- Members: 48,000+
- Chief Executive: Vanessa Harwood-Whitcher
- Senior Leadership Team: Nicole Rinaldi, Ruth Lake, Sanjeet Bains, James Murphy, Claire Tilbury, Val Lee
- Interim BoT Chairman: Bobby Chakravarthy
- Key people: President: Kelly Nicoll CFIOSH
- Staff: 180
- Website: iosh.com

The Institution of Occupational Safety and Health (IOSH) is a global organisation for health and safety professionals, based in the UK.

== Structure ==
IOSH is the chartered professional body for health and safety in the workplace. It acts as a champion, supporter, adviser, advocate and trainer for those who protect the safety, health and wellbeing of others.

IOSH has around 48,000 members, from over 130 countries. This includes an extensive trainer network who deliver well known courses including Leading Safely, Managing Safely and Working Safely. Over 179,000 delegates attended IOSH training courses in 2016.

== History ==
IOSH was founded in 1945 when the Institution of Industrial Safety Officers (IISO) was formed as a division of the Royal Society for the Prevention of Accidents (RoSPA). The Institution gained its charitable status in 1962 and continues to operate as a not-for-profit organisation.

In 1981, the IISO was renamed as the Institution of Occupational Safety and Health (IOSH), and in 2002 was awarded a Royal Charter. From 2005, IOSH began awarding Chartered Safety and Health Practitioner status to recognise individual professionalism and commitment to continued learning and development.

In 2011 along with other health and safety bodies in the UK, IOSH developed the Occupational Safety & Health Consultants Register (OSHCR) to raise awareness and promote the use of certified health and safety consultants in the workplace.

== IOSH's work ==
=== No Time to Lose ===
IOSH’s No Time to Lose campaign was launched in 2014 to highlight the causes of occupational cancer and help businesses take action. The No Time to Lose website provides a host of free resources and information on workplace cancer, and offers the opportunity to sign a pledge to make changes and support the campaign.

=== Occupational Health Toolkit ===
The Occupational Health Toolkit (OH Toolkit) is a free resource to help tackle common occupational health problems such as skin disorders, work related stress and non-work related conditions including diabetes and heart disease. The toolkit brings together information, guidance, case studies and training materials.

=== Guides and research reports ===
As part of their charitable work, IOSH produce a number of guides, such as Safe Start Up guides which are designed to help small business with health and safety. IOSH also fund and produce a number of research reports.

=== Consultations ===
IOSH regularly post consultations, where members can respond and have the opportunity to influence national and international policies.

=== IOSH Blueprint ===
IOSH Blueprint is a framework designed to measure skills and competencies in occupational safety and health. The tool is currently in a beta testing stage. IOSH members, and a number of select organisations, are using the self-assessment tool to identify training and development needs.

== IOSH Training and Skills ==
IOSH Training and Skills is a range of courses designed for different aspects of occupational health and safety. The courses are delivered by IOSH licensed trainers. Trainers must have suitable qualifications and experience before being approved to run IOSH courses.

- Leading Safely
- Managing Safely and Managing Safely Refresher
- Working Safely
- Environment for Business
- Fire Safety for Business and Fire Safety for Managers.

Managing Safely and Working Safely courses are also available in Arabic. IOSH tailored courses are developed by licensed training providers to meet the demands of specialist industry sectors, roles or skills. They are assessed and approved by IOSH to make sure they meet IOSH’s standards.

IOSH recently launched their own level 3 certificate, NCFE IOSH Level 3 General Certificate in Safety and Health for Business, which offers a more direct route to IOSH membership.

== Publications ==
- Policy and Practice in Health and Safety - A peer-reviewed journal published twice a year
- IOSH magazine - A bi-monthly magazine on safety, health and wellbeing in the world of work
- Books - Publications for professionals
- Guidance and research - A number of documents are available free from the website.

IOSH membership grades Enhancing the OSH profession: an update (July 2023)

Student Member: Must be studying for an IOSH qualification or equivalent.

Affiliate Member will be changed to Affiliate Member: Option to upgrade to technical or certified with relevant qualifications and experience or to certified or charted via the experiential route with relevant experience.

Technical Member no change: Continue to maintain CPD in Blueprint at 30 hours per year.

Graduate Member will be changed to Certified Member: Continue to maintain CPD in Blueprint at 30 hours per year.

Charted Member: IOSH e-learning and assessment and continue to maintain CPD in Blueprint at 30 hours per year. New designation of charted safety and health professional.

Charted Fellow: IOSH e-learning and assessment and continue to maintain CPD in Blueprint at 30 hours per year. New designation of charted safety and health professional.

== Membership and designations ==
Categories of membership depend on a combination of academic qualifications, experience and achievement.

=== Chartered fellow (CFIOSH) ===
Chartered Fellows of the Institution are entitled to use the designation Chartered Safety and Health Practitioner and the designatory letters CFIOSH. This is the highest grade. Chartered Fellows must have demonstrated an outstanding contribution to the discipline and profession of health and safety. All Chartered Fellows are required to maintain a Continuing Professional Development (CPD) record.

=== Chartered member (CMIOSH) ===
Chartered member of the Institution are entitled to use the designation Chartered Safety and Health Practitioner and the designatory letters CMIOSH. Chartered Member status requires approved educational qualifications, experience and should complete Initial Professional Development (IPD) Includes Skill Development Portfolio, Open Assessment and Peer Review interview. All Chartered Members are required to maintain a Continuing Professional Development (CPD) record.

=== Certified member (CertIOSH) ===
This category is for those in a more senior health and safety role who are working towards Chartered status. Members can move to Certified membership if they have a recognised and relevant degree-level qualification plus two years’ relevant experience, or if they have significant health and safety leadership experience. Members are required to maintain a Continuing Professional Development (CPD) record.

=== Technical member (Tech IOSH) ===
Technical Members of the Institution are entitled to use the designatory letters Tech IOSH. They require approved educational qualifications like NEBOSH General Certificate, NVQ Level 3, NCRQ L3 etc, plus professional experience. They are required to continue in professional development.

=== Affiliate member ===
Affiliate level is for those who have an interest in, or are employed in occupational safety and health but are not yet eligible to join at other categories of membership.

=== Student member ===
IOSH has recently launched a student membership category which lets OSH students join IOSH for free for the duration of their studies.
