= Health and Safety Executive =

Health and safety body in Great Britain

Agency overview
- Formed: 1 January 1975
- Preceding agencies: Railway Inspectorate; Factory Inspectorate; Mines Inspectorate; Explosives Inspectorate; Nuclear Installations Inspectorate
- Type: Crown status non-departmental public body
- Headquarters: Bootle, Merseyside, England
- Employees: 2,921 (2023/24)
- Annual budget: £303.04 million (2023/24) (Note: Of which £105.4 million comes from fees and other sources of income)
- Agency executives: Sarah Newton, Chair; Sarah Albon, Chief Executive
- Parent department: Department for Work and Pensions
- Key document: Health and Safety at Work etc. Act 1974, ss.10–11
- Website: www.hse.gov.uk
- Applies to: Great Britain
- Relates to: Workplace health and safety
Other UK counterparts
- Northern Ireland: Health and Safety Executive for Northern Ireland

The Health and Safety Executive (HSE) is a public body responsible for the encouragement, regulation and enforcement of workplace health, safety and welfare in Great Britain. It has additionally adopted a research role into occupational risks. It is a non-departmental public body with its headquarters in Bootle, England. The HSE was created by the Health and Safety at Work etc. Act 1974, and has since absorbed earlier regulatory bodies such as the Factory Inspectorate and the Railway Inspectorate though the Railway Inspectorate was transferred to the Office of Rail and Road in April 2006. The HSE is sponsored by the Department for Work and Pensions. As part of its work, HSE investigates industrial accidents, small and large, including major incidents such as the explosion and fire at Buncefield in 2005. Though it formerly reported to the Health and Safety Commission, on 1 April 2008, the two bodies merged. It does not operate in Northern Ireland, where the Health and Safety Executive for Northern Ireland carries out such duties.

== Functions ==
The Executive's duties are to:

- Assist and encourage persons concerned with matters relevant to the operation of the objectives of the Health and Safety at Work etc. Act 1974.
- Make arrangements for and encourage research and publication, training, and information in connection with its work.
- Make arrangements for securing government departments, employers, employees, their respective representative organisations, and other persons are provided with an information and advisory service and are kept informed of, and adequately advised on such matters.
- Propose health and safety regulations.

The Executive is further obliged to keep the Secretary of State informed of its plans and ensure alignment with the policies of the Secretary of State, giving effect to any directions given to it. The Secretary of State can give directions to the Executive.

The Railway Inspectorate was transferred to HSE in 1990. On 1 April 2006, the Executive ceased to have responsibility for railway safety, when the Railway Inspectorate was transferred to the Office of Rail Regulation (now the Office of Rail and Road).

The Executive is responsible for the Employment Medical Advisory Service, which operates as part of its Field Operations Directorate.

== Structure and responsibilities ==
Local authorities are responsible for the enforcement of health and safety legislation in shops, offices, and other parts of the service sector.

The HSE focuses regulation of health and safety in the following sectors of industry:

- Agriculture
- Air transport
- Armed forces
- Catering and hospitality
- Construction industries
- Crown establishments
- Chemical manufacture and storage industries
- Professional diving
- Dockwork
- Education sector e.g. schools
- Engineering sector
- Entertainment and leisure industry
- Fire service
- Food and drink manufacturing
- Footwear and leather industries
- Haulage
- Health services e.g. hospitals
- Gas supply, installation, and the Gas Safe Register
- Laundries and dry-cleaning
- Mining
- Motor vehicle repair
- Office work
- Offshore oil and gas installations
- Paper and board manufacturing industry
- Pesticides
- Police forces
- Printing industries
- Public services
- The quarrying industry
- Recycling and waste management industries
- Textiles industries

Agencies belonging to the HSE include:

=== Health and Safety Executive, Science Division ===
Based in Buxton, Derbyshire, the Health and Safety Executive Science Division (HSL- Health & Safety Laboratory) employs over 350 people including scientists, engineers, psychologists, social scientists, health professionals, and technical specialists.

It was established in 1921 under the Safety in Mines Research Board to carry out large-scale tests related to mining hazards. Following the formation of the HSE, in 1975 the facilities became a Safety Engineering Laboratory and an Explosion and Flame Research Laboratory, operating as part of the Research Laboratories Service Division of the HSE. In 1995 the HSL was formed, including the Buxton site and laboratories in Sheffield. In 2004 the Sheffield activities moved to Buxton, and the University of Sheffield took over the Sheffield laboratory site.

It now operates as an agency carrying out scientific research and investigations (e.g. on the Buncefield fire) for the HSE, other government agencies and the private sector.

=== HM Inspectorate of Mines ===
HM Inspectorate of Mines is responsible for the correct implementation and inspection of safe working procedures within all UK mine workings. It is based in Sheffield, South Yorkshire.

=== Offshore Safety Division ===
The Offshore Safety Division (OSD) was established as a division within HSE in April 1991. This was in response to recommendations of the Cullen Inquiry into the Piper Alpha disaster on 6 July 1988. At the time of the disaster, the Department of Energy (DEn) was responsible for both production and offshore safety; this was perceived as entailing a conflict of interests. Dr. Tony Barrell, Director of HSE's Technology and Air Pollution Division was appointed Chief Executive of OSD, having previously been seconded to the DEn to lead the transfer of responsibilities. At the same time, Ministerial oversight was transferred from the DEn to the Department of Employment. The Offshore Safety Act 1992 made the Mineral Workings (Offshore Installations) Act 1971 and its subsidiary Regulations relevant statutory provisions of the Health and Safety at work etc., Act 1974. The OSD's initial responsibilities included the establishment of the Safety Case Regulations; a thorough review of existing safety legislation and the move towards a goal setting regulatory regime. OSD became part of the HSE's new Hazardous Installations Directorate in 1999; it became part of the new Energy Division in 2013.

=== OSHCR (Occupational Safety & Health Consultants Register) ===
The HSE currently administers the Occupational Safety & Health Consultants Register (OSHCR), a central register of registered safety consultants within the United Kingdom. The intention of the HSE is to pass responsibility of operating the register to the relevant trade and professional bodies once the register is up and running.

=== Building Safety Regulator ===
The HSE initially administered the Building Safety Regulator (BSR), a regulator of safety standards in buildings. On 27 January 2026, the BSR became a standalone regulator.

== Charges ==
One aspect of the charging system operated by the HSE is known as a "fee for intervention" (FFI), which is provided for under regulations 23 to 25 of The Health and Safety and Nuclear (Fees) Regulations 2022. A fee for intervention arises when HSE visit a workplace and find that the business or agency working there is in material breach of health and safety law. The fee covers the time taken by HSE to identify the breach and help the business or gency to put things right.

== Criticism ==
Some of the criticism of HSE has been that its procedures are inadequate to protect safety. For example, the public enquiry by Lord Gill into the Stockline Plastics factory explosion criticised the HSE for "inadequate appreciation of the risks associated with buried LPG pipework…and a failure properly to carry out check visits". However, most criticism of the HSE is that their regulations are over-broad, suffocating, and part of a nanny state. The Daily Telegraph has claimed that the HSE is part of a "compensation culture," that it is undemocratic and unaccountable, and that its rules are costing jobs.

The HSE denies this, saying that much of the criticism is misplaced because it relates to matters outside the HSE's remit. The HSE also responded to criticism by publishing a "Myth of the Month" section on its website between 2007 and 2010, which it described as "exposing the various myths about 'health and safety'". This has become a political issue in the UK. The Lord Young report, published in October 2010, recommended various reforms aiming "to free businesses from unnecessary bureaucratic burdens and the fear of having to pay out unjustified damages claims and legal fees".

== See also ==
- Construction Skills Certification Scheme
