= International Institute of Risk & Safety Management =

Professional organization based in the UK

- Formation: 1975; 51 years ago
- Type: Professional organization
- Registration no.: 1107666
- Legal status: Charitable organization
- Headquarters: London, United Kingdom
- Official language: English
- Chief Executive: Phillip Pearson
- Key people: Rosie Russell (President 2023-2026)
- Budget: £940,765
- Website: www.iirsm.org

The International Institute of Risk & Safety Management (IIRSM) is a non-profit professional organization for occupational health and safety practitioners worldwide, based in the United Kingdom. It provides education, training, advice, resources and networking to assist people and organisations in issues regarding risk management.

== Activities ==
Alongside other Health and Safety bodies, IIRSM assisted with the Occupational Safety & Health Consultants Register (OSHCR). IIRSM represents health, safety and risk professionals present in over 90 countries.

== Levels of membership ==
The IIRSM offers several levels of membership, including Student, Affiliate, Associate (AIIRSM), Member (MIIRSM), and Fellow (FIIRSM). Associates, Members, and Fellows each have experience or certification requirements. The Fellow is the IIRSM's highest award, and requires five consecutive years at full member (MIIRSM) and proof of participation in CPD. The FIIRSM is regarded as the CMIOSH equivalent.

In addition, companies or other organizations may be corporate members.

== Recognized Safety Professionals (RSP) ==
The Institute awards the designation "Recognised Safety Professional" to recognised safety practitioners who demonstrate ongoing evidence of good Health & Safety practices and training (in their own field of business) through IIRSM continuing professional development programme (CPD).

== Continuing Professional Development (CPD) ==
The Institute's CPD cycle lasts for three years. In order to maintain RSP status, one must bank a minimum of at least 30 credits over the three-year period. The 30 credits must be spread across the following three sections (each section will require a minimum of 5 points):

- Maintenance of Skills;
- New Professional Skills; and
- Transferable-Management Skills

== IIRSM Risk Excellence Awards ==
In 2018, IIRSM held its inaugural Risk Excellence Awards, recognising innovative individuals, teams and organisations responsible for implementing best practice in managing risks and opportunities. The Awards are now held on an annual basis.
