= Godfried Toussaint =

Canadian computer scientist (1944–2019)

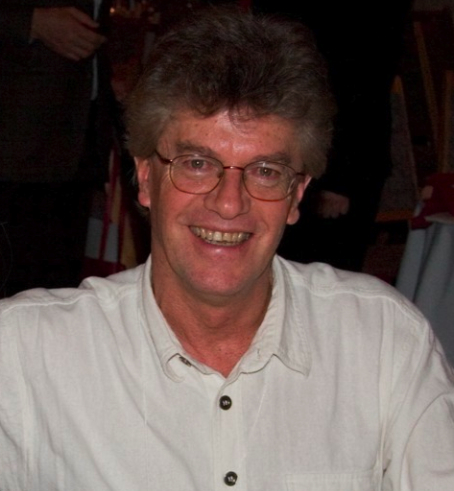
Godfried Toussaint

Godfried Theodore Patrick Toussaint (1944 – July 2019) was a Canadian computer scientist, a professor of computer science, and the head of the Computer Science Program at New York University Abu Dhabi (NYUAD) in Abu Dhabi, United Arab Emirates. He is considered to be the father of computational geometry in Canada. He did research on various aspects of computational geometry, discrete geometry, and their applications: pattern recognition (k-nearest neighbor algorithm, cluster analysis), motion planning, visualization (computer graphics), knot theory (stuck unknot problem), linkage (mechanical) reconfiguration, the art gallery problem, polygon triangulation, the largest empty circle problem, unimodality (unimodal function), and others. Other interests included meander (art), compass and straightedge constructions, instance-based learning, music information retrieval, and computational music theory.

He was a co-founder of the Annual ACM Symposium on Computational Geometry, and the annual Canadian Conference on Computational Geometry.

Along with Selim Akl, he was an author and namesake of the efficient "Akl–Toussaint algorithm" for the construction of the convex hull of a planar point set. This algorithm exhibits a computational complexity with expected value linear in the size of the input. In 1980 he introduced the relative neighborhood graph (RNG) to the fields of pattern recognition and machine learning, and showed that it contained the minimum spanning tree, and was a subgraph of the Delaunay triangulation. Three other well known proximity graphs are the nearest neighbor graph, the Urquhart graph, and the Gabriel graph. The first is contained in the minimum spanning tree, and the Urquhart graph contains the RNG, and is contained in the Delaunay triangulation. Since all these graphs are nested together they are referred to as the Toussaint hierarchy.

== Biography ==
Toussaint was born in 1944 in Belgium. After graduating in 1968 from the University of Tulsa, he went to the University of British Columbia for graduate study, completing his Ph.D. there in 1972. His dissertation, Feature Evaluation Criteria and Contextual Decoding Algorithms in Statistical Pattern Recognition, was supervised by Robert W. Donaldson.

He joined the McGill University faculty in 1972, and became a professor emeritus there in 2007. After retiring from McGill, he became a professor of computer science and head of the computer science department at New York University Abu Dhabi.

He died in July 2019 in Tokyo, Japan. He was in Tokyo to present his work on "The Levenshtein distance as a measure of mirror symmetry and homogeneity for binary digital patterns" in a special session titled "Design & Computation in Geovisualization" convened by the International Cartographic Association Commission on Visual Analytics at the 2019 International Cartographic Conference.

== Mathematical research in music ==
He spent a year in the Music Department at Harvard University doing research on musical similarity, a branch of music cognition. From 2005 he was also a researcher at the Centre for Interdisciplinary Research in Music Media and Technology in the Schulich School of Music at McGill University. He applied computational geometric and discrete mathematics methods to the analysis of symbolically represented music in general, and rhythm in particular. In 2004 he discovered that the Euclidean algorithm for computing the greatest common divisor of two numbers implicitly generates almost all the most important traditional rhythms of the world. His application of mathematical methods for tracing the roots of Flamenco music were the focus of two Canadian television programs.

== Awards ==
In 2018 he was awarded a Lifetime Achievement Award by the Canadian Association of Computer Science. In 1978 he was the recipient of the Pattern Recognition Society's Best Paper of the Year Award. In 1985 he was awarded a two-year Izaak Walton Killam Senior Research Fellowship by the Canada Council for the Arts. In 1988 he received an Advanced Systems Institute Fellowship from the British Columbia Advanced Systems Institute. In 1995 he was given the Vice-Chancellor's Research Best-Practice Fellowship by the University of Newcastle in Australia. In 1996 he won the Canadian Image Processing and Pattern Recognition Society's Service Award for his "outstanding contribution to research and education in Computational Geometry." In May 2001 he was honored with the David Thomson Award for excellence in graduate supervision and teaching at McGill University. In 2009 he won a Radcliffe Fellowship from the Radcliffe Institute for Advanced Study at Harvard University to carry out a research project on the phylogenetics of the musical rhythms of the world.

== Books and book chapters ==
- G. T. Toussaint, The Geometry of Musical Rhythm, Chapman and Hall/CRC, January 2013.
- G. T. Toussaint, Computational Geometry, Editor, North-Holland Publishing Company, Amsterdam, 1985.
- G. T. Toussaint, Computational Morphology, Editor, North-Holland Publishing Company, Amsterdam, 1988.
- E. D. Demaine, B. Gassend, J. O'Rourke, and G. T. Toussaint, "All polygons flip finitely... right?" Surveys on Discrete and Computational Geometry: Twenty Years Later, J. E. Goodman, J. Pach, and R. Pollack, Editors, in Contemporary Mathematics, Vol. 453, 2008, pp. 231–255.
- J. O'Rourke and G. T. Toussaint, "Pattern recognition", Chapter 51 in the Handbook of Discrete and Computational Geometry, Eds. J. E. Goodman and J. O'Rourke, Chapman & Hall/CRC, New York, 2004, pp. 1135–1162.
- M. Soss and G. T. Toussaint, "Convexifying polygons in 3D: a survey", in Physical Knots: Knotting, Linking, and Folding Geometric Objects in R3, AMS Special Session on Physical Knotting, Linking, and Unknotting, Eds. J. A. Calvo, K. Millett, and E. Rawdon, American Mathematical Society, Contemporary Mathematics, Vol. 304, 2002, pp. 269–285.
- G. T. Toussaint, "Applications of the Erdős–Nagy theorem to robotics, polymer physics and molecular biology", Año Mundial de la Matematica, Sección de Publicaciones de la Escuela Tecnica Superior de Ingenieros Industriales, Universidad Politecnica de Madrid, 2002, pp. 195–198.
- J. O'Rourke and G. T. Toussaint, "Pattern recognition", Chapter 43 in the Handbook of Discrete and Computational Geometry, Eds. J. E. Goodman and J. O'Rourke, CRC Press, New York, 1997, pp. 797–813.
- G. T. Toussaint, "Computational geometry and computer vision", in Vision Geometry, Contemporary Mathematics, Volume 119, R. A. Melter, A. Rozenfeld and P. Bhattacharya (editors), American Mathematical Society, 1991, pp. 213–224.
- G. T. Toussaint, "A graph-theoretical primal sketch", in Computational Morphology, G. T. Toussaint (ed.), North-Holland, 1988, pp. 229–260.
- G. T. Toussaint, "Movable separability of sets", in Computational Geometry, G. T. Toussaint (ed.), North-Holland Publishing Co., 1985, pp. 335–375.
