= Ball (gridiron football) =

Ball used to play gridiron football

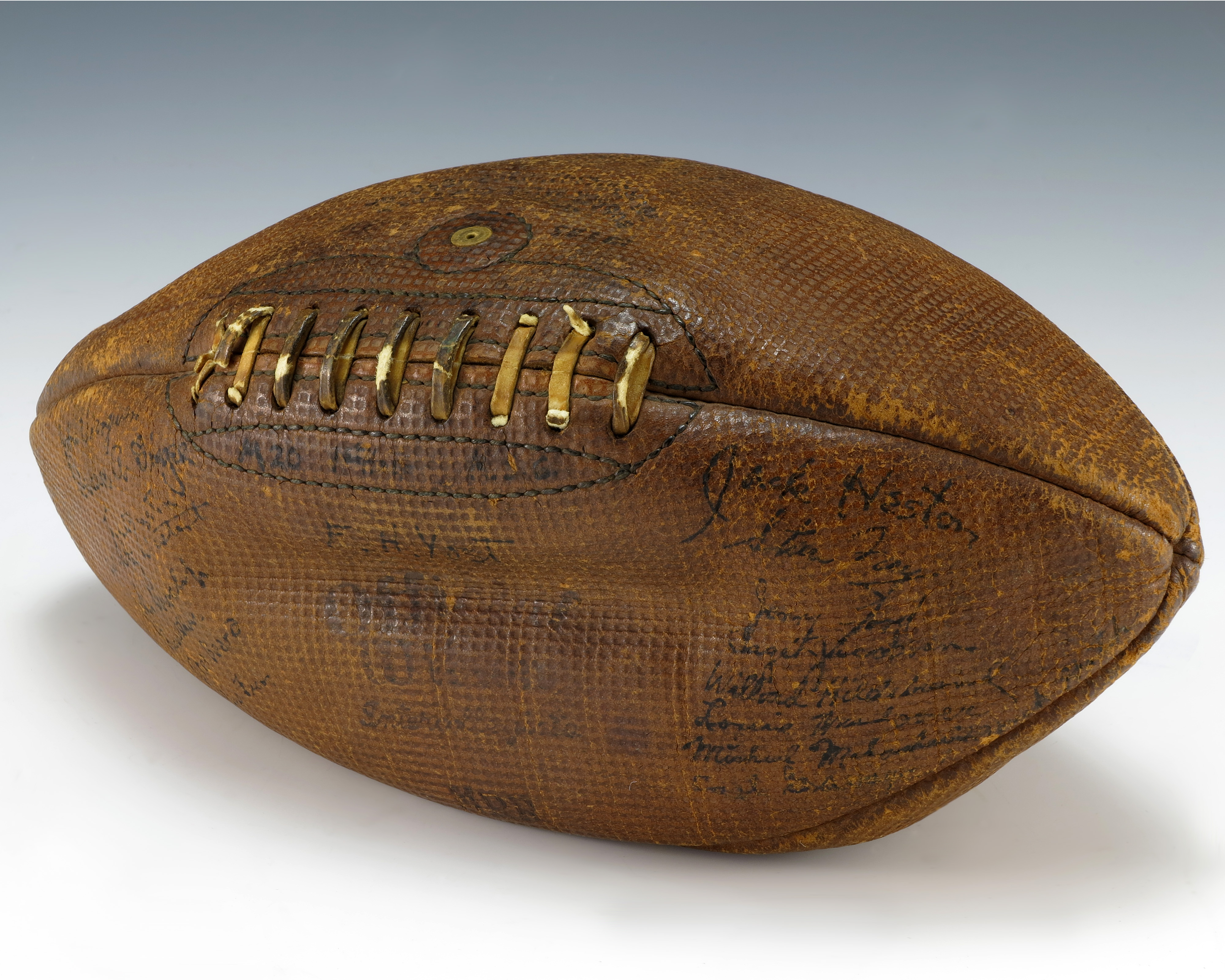
A leather football used during the 1932 college football season

In Northern America, a football (also called a pigskin) is a ball, roughly in the form of a lemon, used in the context of playing gridiron football. Footballs are often made of cowhide leather, as such a material is required in professional and collegiate football, although footballs used in recreation and organized youth leagues may be made of rubber, plastic or composite leather (high school football rule books still allow inexpensive all-rubber footballs, though they are less common than leather).

== History ==
=== Early balls ===
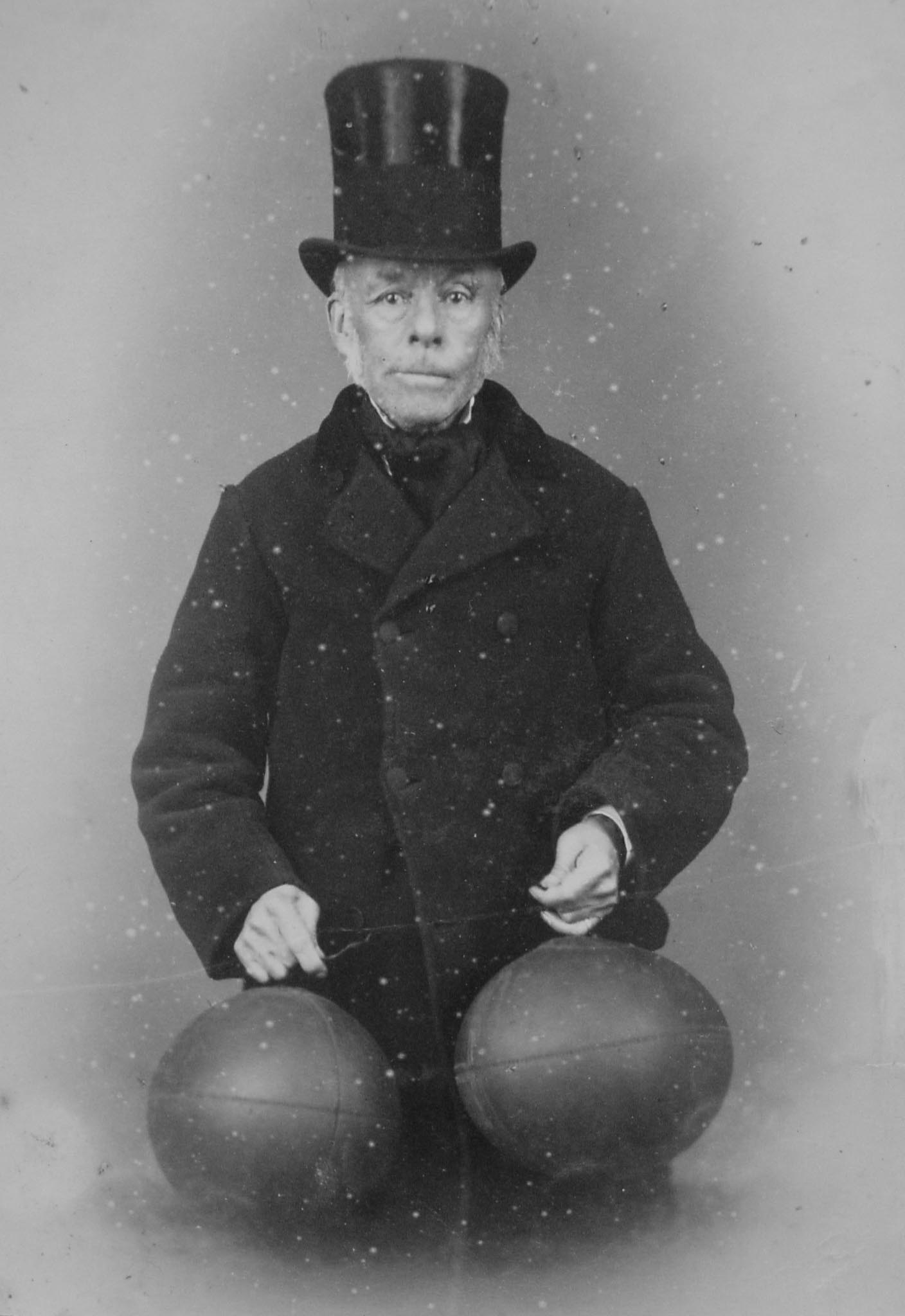
Richard Lindon with two rugby union balls in 1880

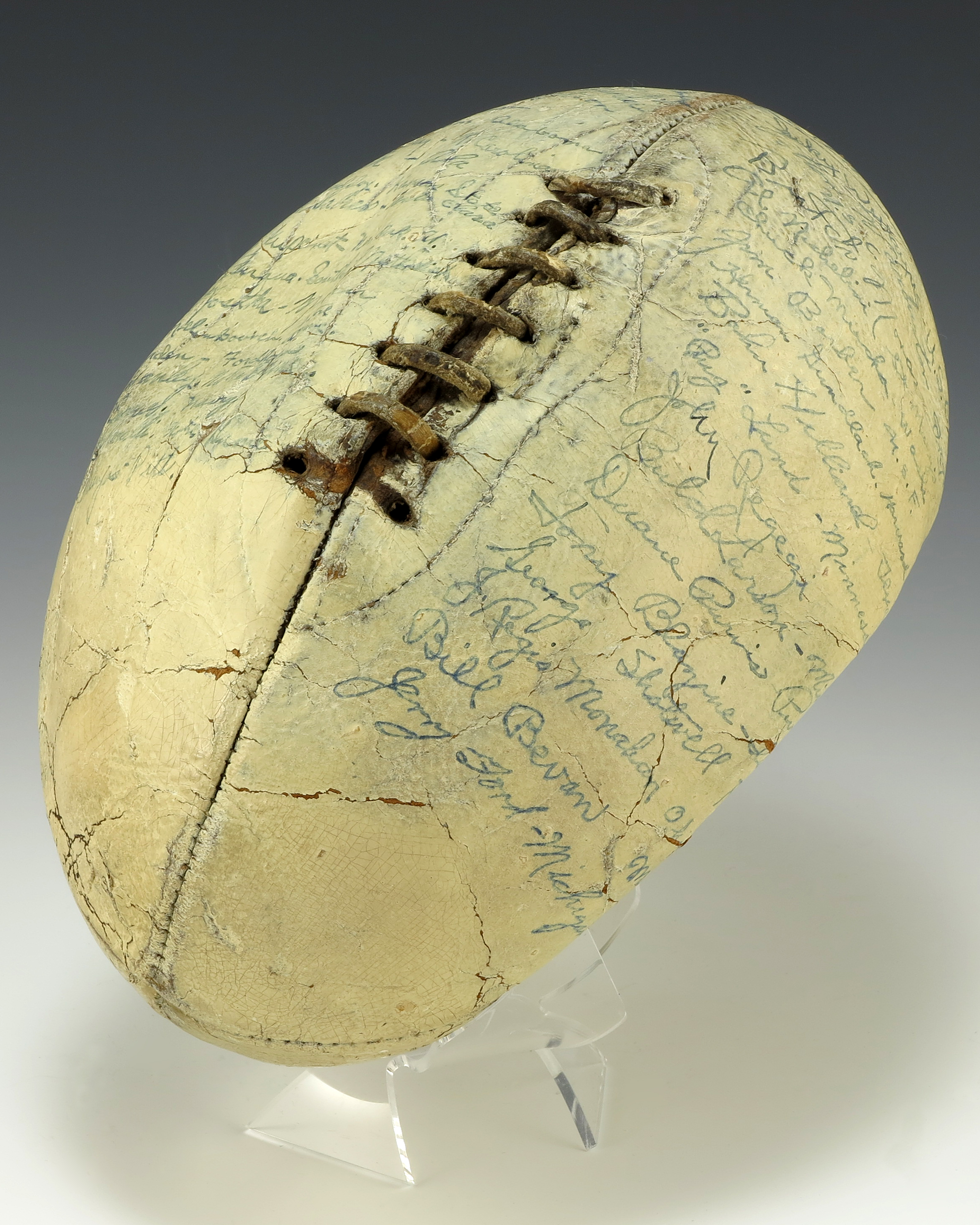
A white football signed by the members of the 1935 Collegiate All-Star Team, including future U.S. president Gerald Ford

In the 1860s, manufactured inflatable balls were introduced through the innovations of English shoemaker Richard Lindon. These were much more regular in shape than the handmade balls of earlier times, making kicking and carrying easier. These early footballs were plum-shaped.

Some teams used to have white footballs for purposes of night practice.

The football changed in 1934, with a rule change that tapered the ball at the ends more and reduced the size around the middle. This new, sleeker ball made it much easier to handle, particularly for passers, while at the same time making the drop kick unreliable and obsolete. Hugh "Shorty" Ray, at the time a college football official and later the NFL's head of officiating, is generally credited with conceiving the pointed football.

=== "The Duke" ===
From 1941 through 1969 and since 2006, the official game ball of the National Football League (NFL) has been stamped with the nickname "The Duke" in honor of Wellington Mara, the longtime owner of the New York Giants, who was named after the Duke of Wellington by his father, Tim Mara, founder and first owner of the Giants. Wilson Sporting Goods, the manufacturer of the NFL ball since 1941, named the ball after Wellington Mara at the urging of George Halas, the owner and head coach of the Chicago Bears, to reward Tim Mara for arranging the contract that made Wilson the official supplier of footballs to the NFL.

The nickname was originally used until 1970, when Wilson changed the game ball upon the National Football League-American Football League merger. Wellington Mara died in 2005 (at age 89), and Wilson returned "The Duke" to the game ball the following year in his honor.

== Properties ==
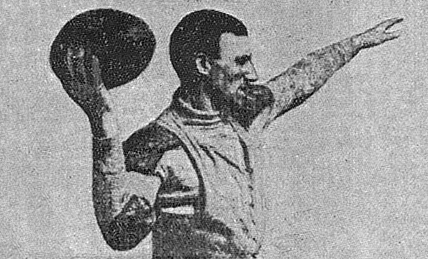
Early American footballs were essentially rugby balls, later redesigned to make them easier to throw. In this 1907 photo, Bradbury Robinson, who threw the first legal forward pass, demonstrates an "Overhand spiral—fingers on lacing"

Coach John Heisman (the namesake for today's Heisman Trophy) was a Shakespearean actor in the offseason, and would open each season by saying to his freshmen football players:

What is this? It is a prolate spheroid, an elongated sphere in which the outer leather casing is drawn tightly over a somewhat smaller rubber tubing. Better to have died as a small boy than to fumble this football.

Leather panels are typically tanned to a natural brown color, which is usually required in professional leagues and collegiate play. At least one manufacturer uses leather that has been tanned to provide a "tacky" grip in dry or wet conditions. Historically, white footballs have been used in games played at night so that the ball can be seen more easily; however, improved artificial lighting conditions have made this no longer necessary. At most levels of play (but not, notably, the NFL), white stripes are painted on each end of the ball, halfway around the circumference, to improve nighttime visibility and also to differentiate the college football from the pro football. The NFL formerly used white-striped footballs for late afternoon and night games; a striped ball was used in Super Bowl VIII, a late afternoon game in January under dark overcast skies. The NFL ended the use of white stripes after the 1975 season, as the stripes were slippery and made the ball more difficult to throw.

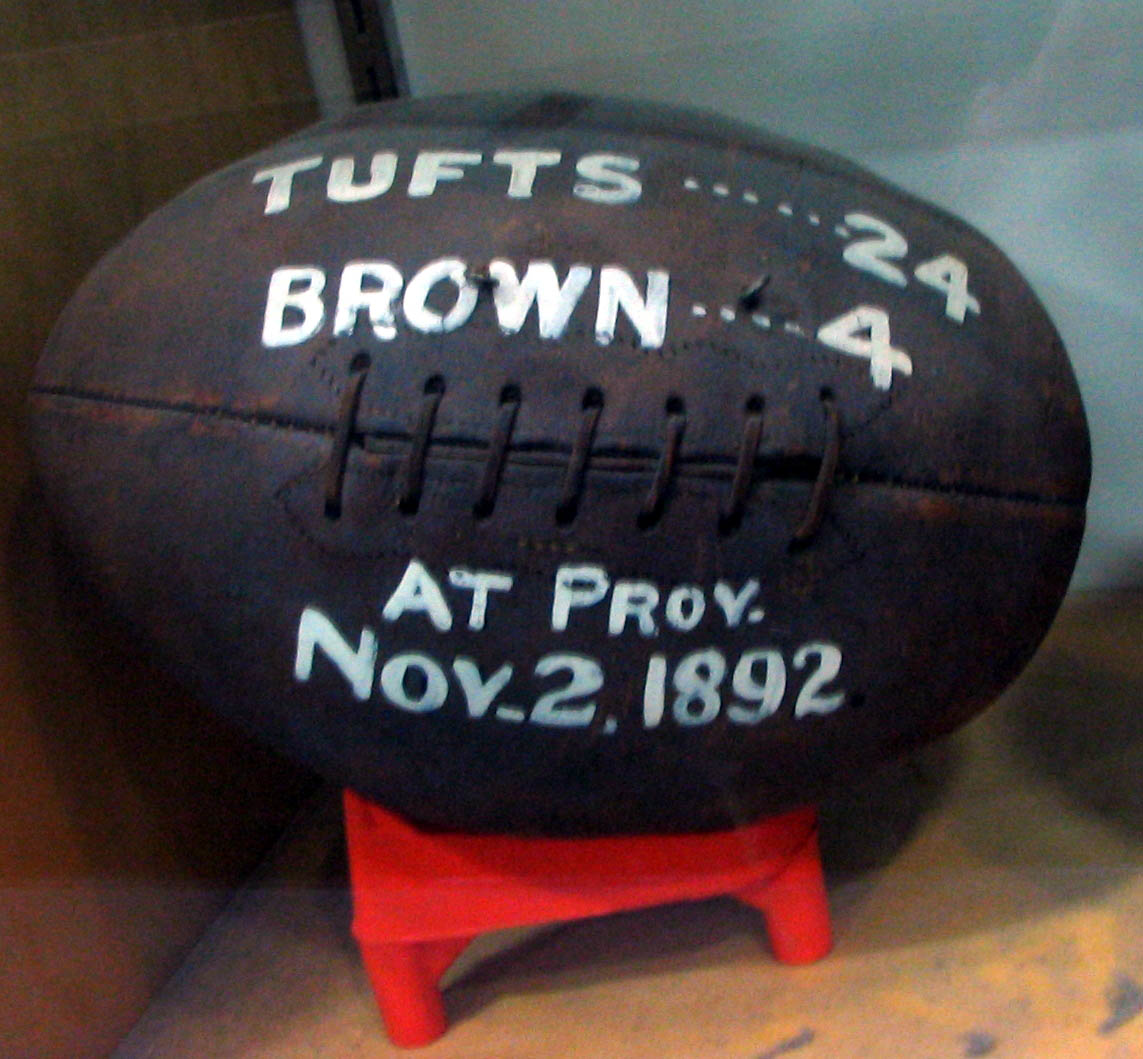
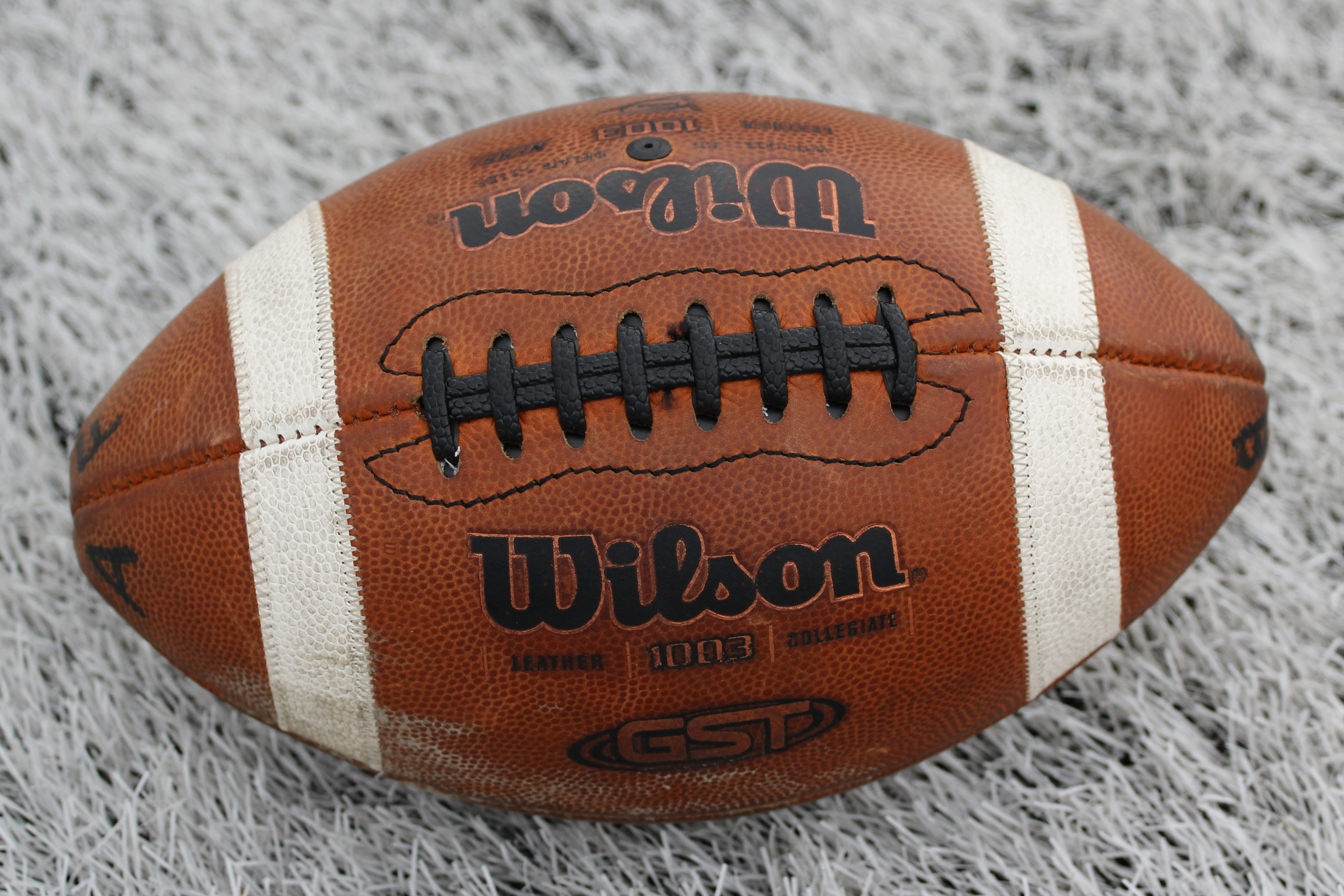
The old melon-shaped ball (left, an 1892 ball) measures from 28 to 22 inches (71 to 56 cm) in circumference, while the modern ball (right) measures approximately 21 inches (53 cm).

The leather is usually stamped with a pebble-grain texture to help players grip the ball. Some or all of the panels may be stamped with the manufacturer's name, league or conference logos, signatures, and other markings. Four panels or pieces of leather or plastic are required for each football. After a series of quality control inspections for weight and blemishes, workers begin the actual manufacturing process.

Two of the panels are perforated along adjoining edges, so that they can be laced together. One of these lacing panels receives an additional perforation and reinforcements in its center, to hold the inflation valve. Each panel is attached to an interior lining. The four panels are then stitched together in an "inside-out" manner. The edges with the lacing holes, however, are not stitched together. The ball is then turned right side out by pushing the panels through the lacing hole. A polyurethane or rubber lining called a bladder is then inserted through the lacing hole. Polyvinyl chloride or leather laces are inserted through the perforations, to provide a grip for holding, hiking and passing the football. Before play, according to the NFL rules, the ball must be inflated to an air pressure between 12.5 and 13.5 pounds per square inch (86 and 93 kilopascals). The ball weighs 14 to 15 ounces (400 to 430 grams).

In the CFL, the stripes traverse the entire circumference of the ball; its ball used slightly different dimensions prior to the 2018 season, when the league adopted the NFL specifications for its ball with the previous striping retained. The UFL used a ball with lime-green stripes. The 2001 XFL used a novel color pattern, a black ball with red curved lines in lieu of stripes, for its footballs; this design was redone in a tan and navy color scheme for the Arena Football League in 2003. The 2020 XFL is standard brown but with X markings in team colors at each point (in 2020); in 2023, the league switched to a ball resembling the NFL ball, but with the team logo imprinted on one panel. Three indoor American football leagues; the Can-Am League, UIFL, and AIF, used a ball with red, white and blue panels. Both the 1980s and 2020s incarnations of the USFL have used the same Wilson football the NFL used at the time, with the only differences being the word markings and signature. The World Football League's football was a distinct orange color, said to be more visible during the night as most of that league's games would be played in the evenings.

Prior to the merger, the American Football League's balls, the J6V (or J6-V / "Cushion Control") and J5V (or J5-V) by Spalding were 1/4 in (0.64 cm) narrower and 1/4 in (0.64 cm) longer than the NFL football. In Super Bowl I, the two teams played with their respective footballs from each league; the Chiefs used the AFL ball, and the Packers played with the NFL ball, "The Duke" by Wilson.

The shape of the ball gives it different aerodynamic properties, depending on the way that it is thrown, kicked, or otherwise allowed to tumble across the field. The ball approximates the three-dimensional shape known in geometry as a lemon, which is formed by rotating a lens about its axis. A lens is formed by the intersection of two circles of the same radius. The cross-section of an NFL ball can be compared with a vesica piscis, which is a type of lens described in Euclid's Elements, where the center of each disk lies on the perimeter of the other. In a forward pass, the quarterback orients the ball with its lengthwise axis along the direction of travel, and imparts spin on it for gyroscopic stability. A 2012 RMIT University article gives the drag coefficient of NFL and NCAA footballs, with the ball pointing in the direction of its travel, of 0.19 and 0.20 respectively.

== NFL regulations ==
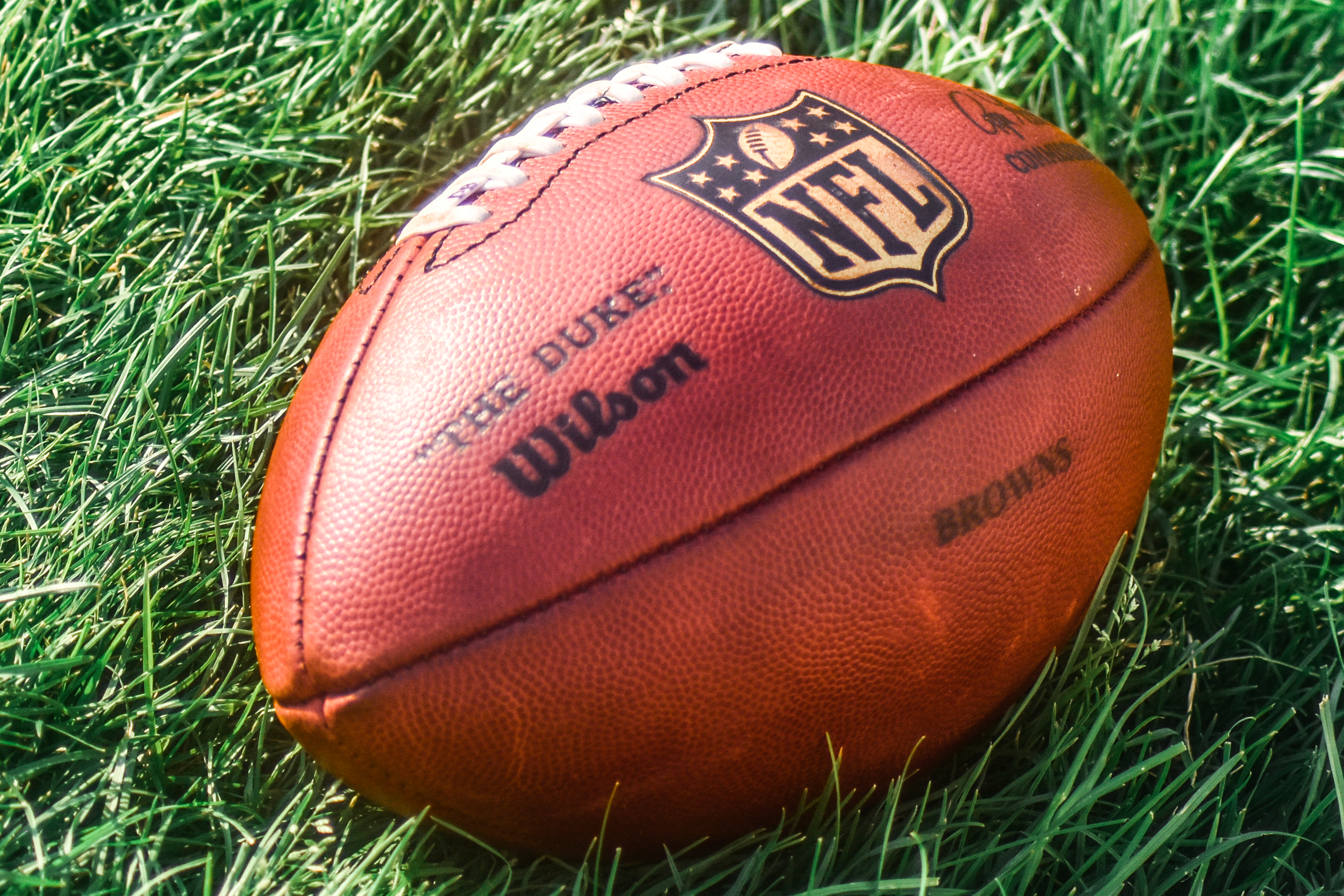
A Wilson modern American football, as used in the National Football League

In an NFL game, the home team must have 36 balls for an outdoor game or 24 for an indoor game, and they must be available for the referee to test with a pressure gauge two and a half hours before the game to keep players from cheating. Twelve new footballs, sealed in a special box and shipped by the manufacturer, are opened in the officials' locker room two hours and 15 minutes before the game. These balls are specially marked with the letter "K" and are used exclusively for the kicking game. The visiting team may also present 12 balls to the referee for outdoor games for inspection. The NFL introduced kicking balls (K-balls) to prevent teams from doctoring balls after the NFL Competition Committee determined that teams conditioned balls so they would fly higher and travel further.

Since 1941, Horween Leather Company has been the exclusive supplier of leather for National Football League footballs. The arrangement was established by Arnold Horween, who had played and coached in the NFL. Horween Leather Company also supplies leather to Spalding, which, at one time, supplied game balls to the now-defunct Arena Football League. Despite the moniker "pigskin" sometimes used to refer to footballs, cow leather is used.

== Recreational variations ==
Minnesota Vikings kicker Fred Cox, during his NFL career, is credited with developing an all-polyurethane foam football, which he sold to Nerf. Nerf later added the vortex football, also made of foam, with a smaller body and torpedo tail fins, resembling a Ketchum Grenade. Foam footballs such as Nerf's, especially the vortex football, can be thrown greater distances than a traditional air-filled leather or rubber ball, but their kicking range is much shorter, with the vortex football being practically unusable for kicking.

== See also ==
- Football (ball)
- Ball (association football)
- Rugby ball
- Deflategate
