= Semi-Yao graph =

The k-semi-Yao graph (k-SYG) of a set of n objects P is a geometric proximity graph, which was first described to present a kinetic data structure for maintenance of all the nearest neighbors on moving objects. It is named for its relation to the Yao graph, which is named after Andrew Yao.

== Construction ==
The k-SYG is constructed as follows. The space around each point p in P is partitioned into a set of polyhedral cones of opening angle $\theta$, meaning the angle of each pair of rays inside a polyhedral cone emanating from the apex is at most $\theta$, and then p connects to k points of P in each of the polyhedral cones whose projections on the cone axis is minimum.

== Properties ==
- The k-SYG, where k = 1, is known as the theta graph, and is the union of two Delaunay triangulations.
- For a small $\theta$ and an appropriate cone axis, the k-SYG gives a supergraph of the k-nearest neighbor graph (k-NNG). For example, in 2D, if we partition the plane around each point into six wedges of equal angles, and pick the cone axes on directions of the cone bisectors, we obtain a k-SYG as a supergraph for the k-NNG.

== See also ==
- Geometric spanner
