= Fusiform =

Spindle-like shape

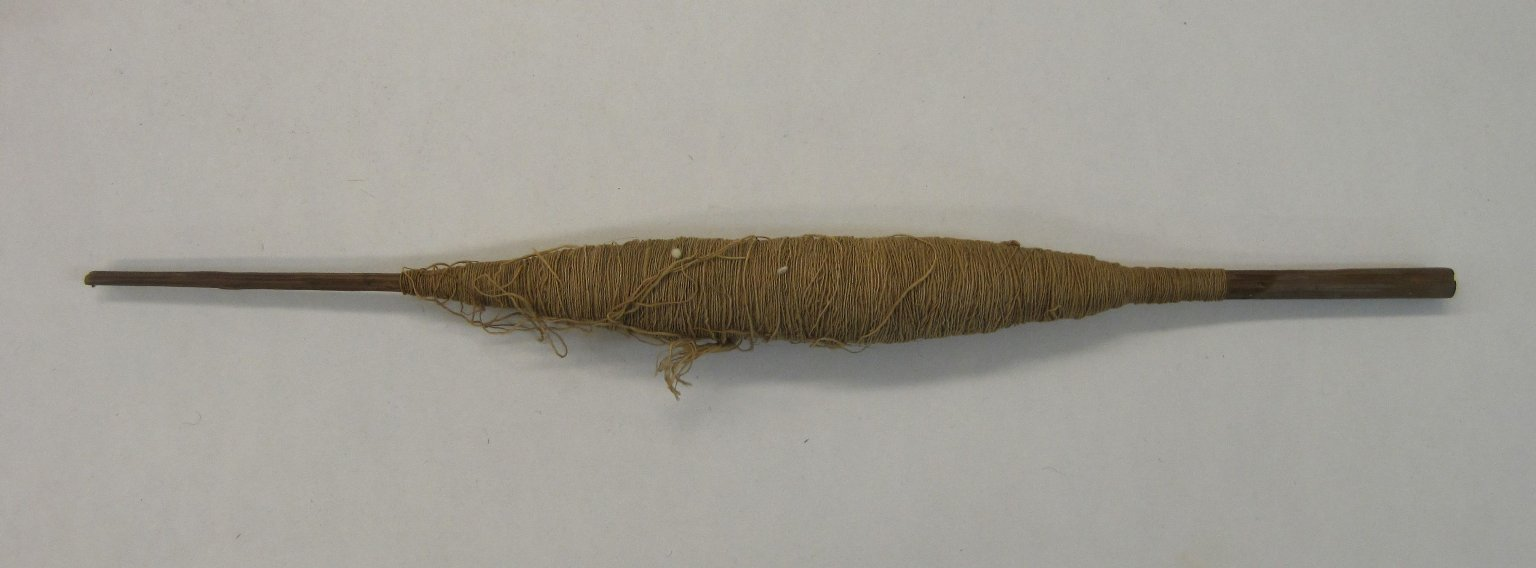
Spindle with yarn

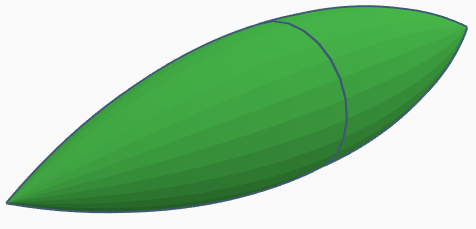
A lemon in geometry

Fusiform (from Latin fusus ‘spindle’) means having a spindle-like shape that is wide in the middle and tapers at both ends. It is similar to the lemon-shape, but often implies a focal broadening of a structure that continues from one or both ends, such as an aneurysm on a blood vessel.

== Examples ==
- Fusiform, a body shape common to many aquatic animals, characterized by being tapered at both the head and the tail
- Fusiform, a classification of aneurysm
- Fusiform bacteria (spindled rods, that is, fusiform bacilli), such as the Fusobacteriota
- Fusiform cell (biology)
- Fusiform face area, a part of the human visual system which seems to specialize in facial recognition
- Fusiform gyrus, part of the temporal lobe of the brain
- Fusiform muscle, where the fibres run parallel along the length of the muscle
- Fusiform neuron, a spindle-shaped neuron

== See also ==
- Streamliner, a fusiform hydro-/aero-dynamic vehicle. Historically, the adjective "streamlined" was more commonly used among designers for the word "fusiform".
