= Relative neighborhood graph =

Geometric graph connecting nearby points

The relative neighborhood graph of 100 random points in a unit square.

In computational geometry, the relative neighborhood graph (RNG) is an undirected graph defined on a set of points in the Euclidean plane by connecting two points $p$ and $q$ by an edge whenever there does not exist a third point $r$ that is closer to both $p$ and $q$ than they are to each other. This graph was proposed by Godfried Toussaint in 1980 as a way of defining a structure from a set of points that would match human perceptions of the shape of the set.

== Algorithms ==
Supowit (1983) showed how to construct the relative neighborhood graph of $n$ points in the plane efficiently in $O(n\log n)$ time. It can be computed in $O(n)$ expected time, for random set of points distributed uniformly in the unit square. The relative neighborhood graph can be computed in linear time from the Delaunay triangulation of the point set.

== Generalizations ==
Because it is defined only in terms of the distances between points, the relative neighborhood graph can be defined for point sets in any dimension, and for non-Euclidean metrics. Computing the relative neighborhood graph, for higher-dimensional point sets, can be done in time $O(n^2)$.

== Related graphs ==
The relative neighborhood graph is an example of a lens-based beta skeleton. It is a subgraph of the Delaunay triangulation. In turn, the Euclidean minimum spanning tree is a subgraph of it, from which it follows that it is a connected graph.

The Urquhart graph, the graph formed by removing the longest edge from every triangle in the Delaunay triangulation, was originally proposed as a fast method to compute the relative neighborhood graph. Although the Urquhart graph sometimes differs from the relative neighborhood graph it can be used as an approximation to the relative neighborhood graph.
