= The Geometry of Musical Rhythm =

2013 book by Godfried Toussaint

The Geometry of Musical Rhythm: What Makes a "Good" Rhythm Good?
- First edition
- Author: Godfried Toussaint
- Language: English
- Publisher: Chapman & Hall/CRC
- Publication date: 2013

The Geometry of Musical Rhythm: What Makes a "Good" Rhythm Good? is a book on the mathematics of rhythms and drum beats. It was written by Godfried Toussaint, and published by Chapman & Hall/CRC in 2013 and in an expanded second edition in 2020. The Basic Library List Committee of the Mathematical Association of America has suggested its inclusion in undergraduate mathematics libraries.

== Author ==
Godfried Toussaint (1944–2019) was a Belgian–Canadian computer scientist who worked as a professor of computer science for McGill University and New York University. His main professional expertise was in computational geometry, but he was also a jazz drummer, held a long-term interest in the mathematics of music and musical rhythm, and since 2005 held an affiliation as a researcher in the Centre for Interdisciplinary Research in Music Media and Technology in the Schulich School of Music at McGill. In 2009 he visited Harvard University as a Radcliffe Fellow in advancement of his research in musical rhythm.

== Topics ==
In order to study rhythms mathematically, Toussaint abstracts away many of their features that are important musically, involving the sounds or strengths of the individual beats, the phasing of the beats, hierarchically-structured rhythms, or the possibility of music that changes from one rhythm to another. The information that remains describes the beats of each bar (an evenly-spaced cyclic sequence of times) as being either on-beats (times at which a beat is emphasized in the musical performance) or off-beats (times at which it is skipped or performed only weakly). This can be represented combinatorially as a necklace, an equivalence class of binary sequences under rotations, with true binary values representing on-beats and false representing off-beats. Alternatively, Toussaint uses a geometric representation as a convex polygon, the convex hull of a subset of the vertices of a regular polygon, where the vertices of the hull represent times when a beat is performed; two rhythms are considered the same if the corresponding polygons are congruent.

Polygonal representation of the tresillo rhythm

As an example, reviewer William Sethares (himself a music theorist and engineer) presents a representation of this type for the tresillo rhythm, in which three beats are hit out of an eight-beat bar, with two long gaps and one short gap between each beat. The tresillo may be represented geometrically as an isosceles triangle, formed from three vertices of a regular octahedron, with the two long sides and one short side of the triangle corresponding to the gaps between beats. In the figure, the conventional start to a tresillo bar, the beat before the first of its two longer gaps, is at the top vertex, and the chronological progression of beats corresponds to the clockwise ordering of vertices around the polygon.

The book uses this method to study and classify existing rhythms from world music, to analyze their mathematical properties (for instance, the fact that many of these rhythms have a spacing between their beats that, like the tresillo, is near-uniform but not exactly uniform), to devise algorithms that can generate similar nearly uniformly spaced beat patterns for arbitrary numbers of beats in the rhythm and in the bar, to measure the similarity between rhythms, to cluster rhythms into related groups using their similarities, and ultimately to try to capture the suitability of a rhythm for use in music by a mathematical formula.

== Audience and reception ==
Toussaint has used this book as auxiliary material in introductory computer programming courses, to provide programming tasks for the students. It is accessible to readers without much background in mathematics or music theory, and Setheres writes that it "would make a great introduction to ideas from mathematics and computer science for the musically inspired student". Reviewer Russell Jay Hendel suggests that, as well as being read for pleasure, it could be a textbook for an advanced elective for a mathematics student, or a general education course in mathematics for non-mathematicians. Professionals in ethnomusicology, music history, the psychology of music, music theory, and musical composition may also find it of interest.

Despite concerns with some misused terminology, with "naïveté towards core music theory", and with a mismatch between the visual representation of rhythm and its aural perception, music theorist Mark Gotham calls the book "a substantial contribution to a field that still lags behind the more developed theoretical literature on pitch". And although reviewer Juan G. Escudero complains that the mathematical abstractions of the book misses many important aspects of music and musical rhythm, and that many rhythmic features of contemporary classical music have been overlooked, he concludes that "transdisciplinary efforts of this kind are necessary". Reviewer Ilhand Izmirli calls the book "delightful, informative, and innovative". Hendel adds that the book's presentation of its material as speculative and exploratory, rather than as definitive and completed, is "exactly what [mathematics] students need".
