= K. Ruben Gabriel =

German-born Israeli statistician (1929–2003)

Kuno Ruben Gabriel
- Born: 1929; Germany
- Died: May 25, 2003 (aged 73–74)
- Education: London School of Economics, Hebrew University of Jerusalem
- Known for: Inventing the biplot and the Gabriel graph, work in statistical meteorology
- Awards: Fellow of the American Statistical Association, Fellow of the Institute of Mathematical Statistics, Elected member of the International Statistical Institute
- Scientific career
- Fields: Statistics
- Workplaces: Hebrew University of Jerusalem, University of Rochester

Kuno Ruben Gabriel (1929–2003) was a statistician known for the inventing the biplot and the Gabriel graph and for his work in statistical meteorology.

Gabriel was born in Germany, emigrated to France, grew up in Israel, was educated at the London School of Economics and the Hebrew University of Jerusalem, taught at the Hebrew University until 1975, and then moved to the University of Rochester where he remained until his retirement in 1997. He died on May 25, 2003.

He was a fellow of the American Statistical Association and the Institute of Mathematical Statistics, and was an elected member of the International Statistical Institute.
