= Biplot =

Type of exploratory graph used in statistics

Biplot of Fisher's iris data set. The scattered points are the input scores of observations and the arrows show the contribution of each feature to the input loading vectors.

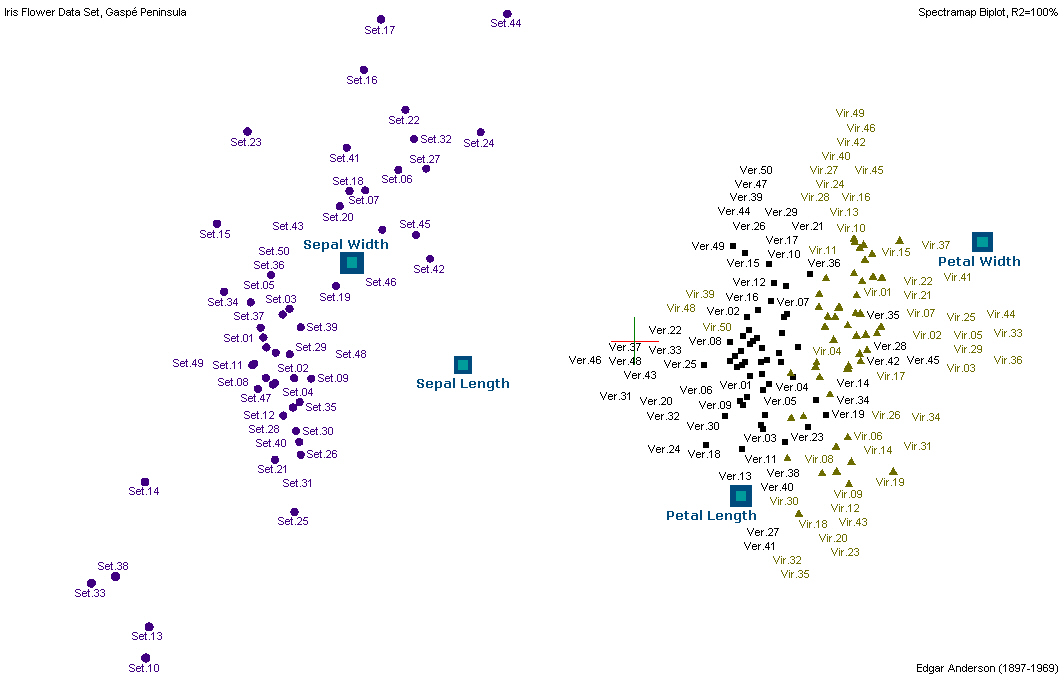
Spectramap biplot of Anderson's iris data set

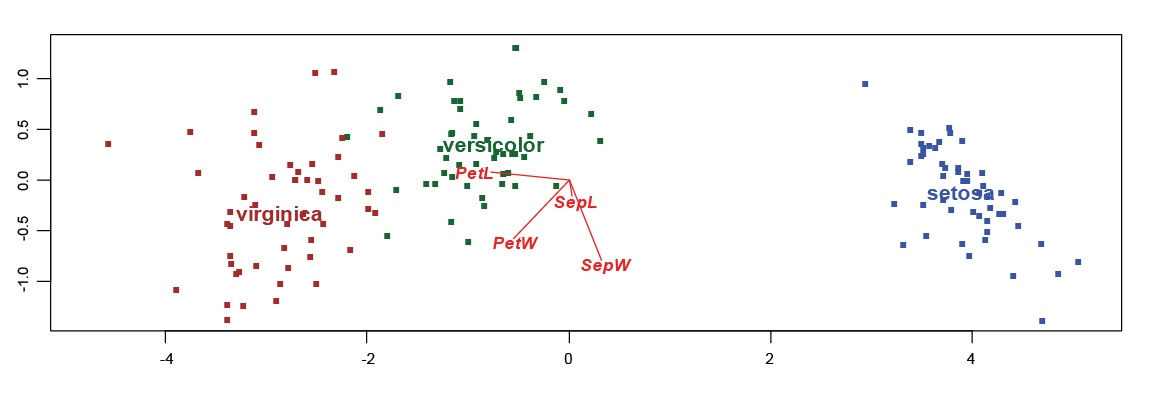
Discriminant analysis biplot of Fisher's iris data

Biplots are a type of exploratory graph used in statistics, a generalization of the simple two-variable scatterplot. A biplot overlays a score plot with a loading plot. A biplot allows information on both samples and variables of a data matrix to be displayed graphically. Samples are displayed as points while variables are displayed either as vectors, linear axes or nonlinear trajectories. In the case of categorical variables, category level points may be used to represent the levels of a categorical variable. A generalised biplot displays information on both continuous and categorical variables.

The biplot was introduced by K. Ruben Gabriel (1971).

== Construction ==
A biplot is constructed by using the singular value decomposition (SVD) to obtain a low-rank approximation to a transformed version of the data matrix X, whose n rows are the samples (also called the cases, or objects), and whose p columns are the variables. The transformed data matrix Y is obtained from the original matrix X by centering and optionally standardizing the columns (the variables). Using the SVD, we can write Y = Σ_{k=1,...p}d_{k}u_{k}v_{k}^{T};, where the u_{k} are n-dimensional column vectors, the v_{k} are p-dimensional column vectors, and the d_{k} are a non-increasing sequence of non-negative scalars. The biplot is formed from two scatterplots that share a common set of axes and have a between-set scalar product interpretation. The first scatterplot is formed from the points (d_{1}^{α}u_{1i}, d_{2}^{α}u_{2i}), for i = 1,...,n. The second plot is formed from the points (d_{1}^{1−α}v_{1j}, d_{2}^{1−α}v_{2j}), for j = 1,...,p. This is the biplot formed by the dominant two terms of the SVD, which can then be represented in a two-dimensional display. Typical choices of α are 1 (to give a distance interpretation to the row display) and 0 (to give a distance interpretation to the column display), and in some rare cases α=1/2 to obtain a symmetrically scaled biplot (which gives no distance interpretation to the rows or the columns, but only the scalar product interpretation). The set of points depicting the variables can be drawn as arrows from the origin to reinforce the idea that they represent biplot axes onto which the samples can be projected to approximate the original data.

== Sources ==
- Gabriel, K.R. (1971). "The biplot graphic display of matrices with application to principal component analysis". Biometrika. 58 (3): 453–467. doi:10.1093/biomet/58.3.453.
- Gower, J.C., Lubbe, S. and le Roux, N. (2010). Understanding Biplots. Wiley. ISBN 978-0-470-01255-0
- Gower, J.C. and Hand, D.J (1996). Biplots. Chapman & Hall, London, UK. ISBN 0-412-71630-5
- Yan, W. and Kang, M.S. (2003). GGE Biplot Analysis. CRC Press, Boca Raton, Florida. ISBN 0-8493-1338-4
- Demey, J.R., Vicente-Villardón, J.L., Galindo-Villardón, M.P. and Zambrano, A.Y. (2008). Identifying molecular markers associated with classification of genotypes by External Logistic Biplots. Bioinformatics. 24(24):2832–2838
