= Kinetic Euclidean minimum spanning tree =

A kinetic Euclidean minimum spanning tree is a kinetic data structure that maintains the Euclidean minimum spanning tree (EMST) of a set P of n points that are moving continuously.

For the set of points P in 2-dimensional space, there are two kinetic algorithms for maintenance of the EMST.

Rahmati and Zarei build a kinetic data structure based on the kinetic Delaunay triangulation to handle updates to the EMST in polylog time per event. Their kinetic data structure handles $O(n*m)$ events, where m is the number of all changes to the Delaunay triangulation of the moving points. Their kinetic approach can work well for maintenance of the minimum spanning tree (MST) of a planar graph whose edge weights are changing as a continuous function of time.

Abam, Rahmati, and Zarei provide a significant improvement on exact kinetic maintenance on the Euclidean minimum spanning tree. Their kinetic data structure handles a nearly cubic number of events.
