= Lens (geometry) =

Convex plane region bounded by two circular arcs

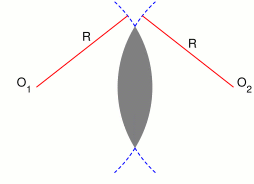
A lens contained between two circular arcs of radius R, and centers at O_{1} and O_{2}

In 2-dimensional geometry, a lens is a convex region bounded by two circular arcs joined to each other at their endpoints. In order for this shape to be convex, both arcs must bow outwards (convex-convex). This shape can be formed as the intersection of two circular disks. It can also be formed as the union of two circular segments (regions between the chord of a circle and the circle itself), joined along a common chord.

== Types ==
Example of two asymmetric lenses (left and right) and one symmetric lens (in the middle)

The Vesica piscis is the intersection of two disks with the same radius, R, and with the distance between centers also equal to R.

If the two arcs of a lens have equal radius, it is called a symmetric lens, otherwise is an asymmetric lens.

The vesica piscis is one form of a symmetric lens, formed by arcs of two circles whose centers each lie on the opposite arc. The arcs meet at angles of 120° at their endpoints.

== Area ==
Symmetric

The area of a symmetric lens can be expressed in terms of the radius R and arc lengths θ in radians:

$$A =  R^2\left(\theta - \sin \theta \right).$$

Asymmetric

The area of an asymmetric lens formed from circles of radii R and r with distance d between their centers is

$$A=r^2 \cos^{-1} \left(\frac{d^2+r^2-R^2}{2dr}\right) +R^2\cos^{-1}\left( \frac{d^2+R^2-r^2}{2dR}\right) -2\Delta$$

where

$$\Delta = \frac{1}{4} \sqrt{(-d+r+R)(d-r+R)(d+r-R)(d+r+R)}$$

is the area of a triangle with sides d, r, and R.

The two circles overlap if $d<r+R$. For sufficiently large $d$, the coordinate $x$ of the lens centre lies between the coordinates of the two circle centers:

For small $d$ the coordinate $x$ of the lens centre lies outside the line that connects the circle centres:

By eliminating y from the circle equations $x^2+y^2=r^2$ and $(x-d)^2+y^2=R^2$ the abscissa of the intersecting rims is

$$x=(d^2+r^2-R^2)/(2d)$$.

The sign of x, i.e., $d^2$ being larger or smaller than $R^2-r^2$, distinguishes the two cases shown in the images.

The ordinate of the intersection is

$$y=\sqrt{r^2-x^2} = \frac{\sqrt{[(R-d)^2-r^2][r^2-(R+d)^2]}}{2d}$$.

Negative values under the square root indicate that the rims of the two circles do not touch because the circles are too far apart or one circle lies entirely within the other.

The value under the square root is a biquadratic polynomial of d. The four roots of this polynomial are associated with y=0 and with the four values of d where the two circles have only one point in common.

The angles in the blue triangle of sides d, r and R are

$$\sin a_r  = y/r;\quad \sin a_R = y/R$$

where y is the ordinate of the intersection. The branch of the arcsin with $a_r>\pi/2$ is to be taken if $d^2<R^2-r^2$.

The area of the triangle is $\Delta = \frac12 yd$.

The area of the asymmetric lens is $A=a_r r^2+a_R R^2-yd$, where the two angles are measured in radians. [This is an application of the Inclusion-exclusion principle: the two circular sectors centered at (0,0) and (d,0) with central angles $2a_r$ and $2a_R$ have areas $2a_r r^2$ and $2a_R R^2$. Their union covers the triangle, the flipped triangle with corner at (x, −y), and twice the lens area.]

== Applications ==
A lens with a different shape forms the answer to Mrs. Miniver's problem, on finding a lens with half the area of the union of the two circles.

Lenses are used to define beta skeletons, geometric graphs defined on a set of points by connecting pairs of points by an edge whenever a lens determined by the two points is empty.

== See also ==
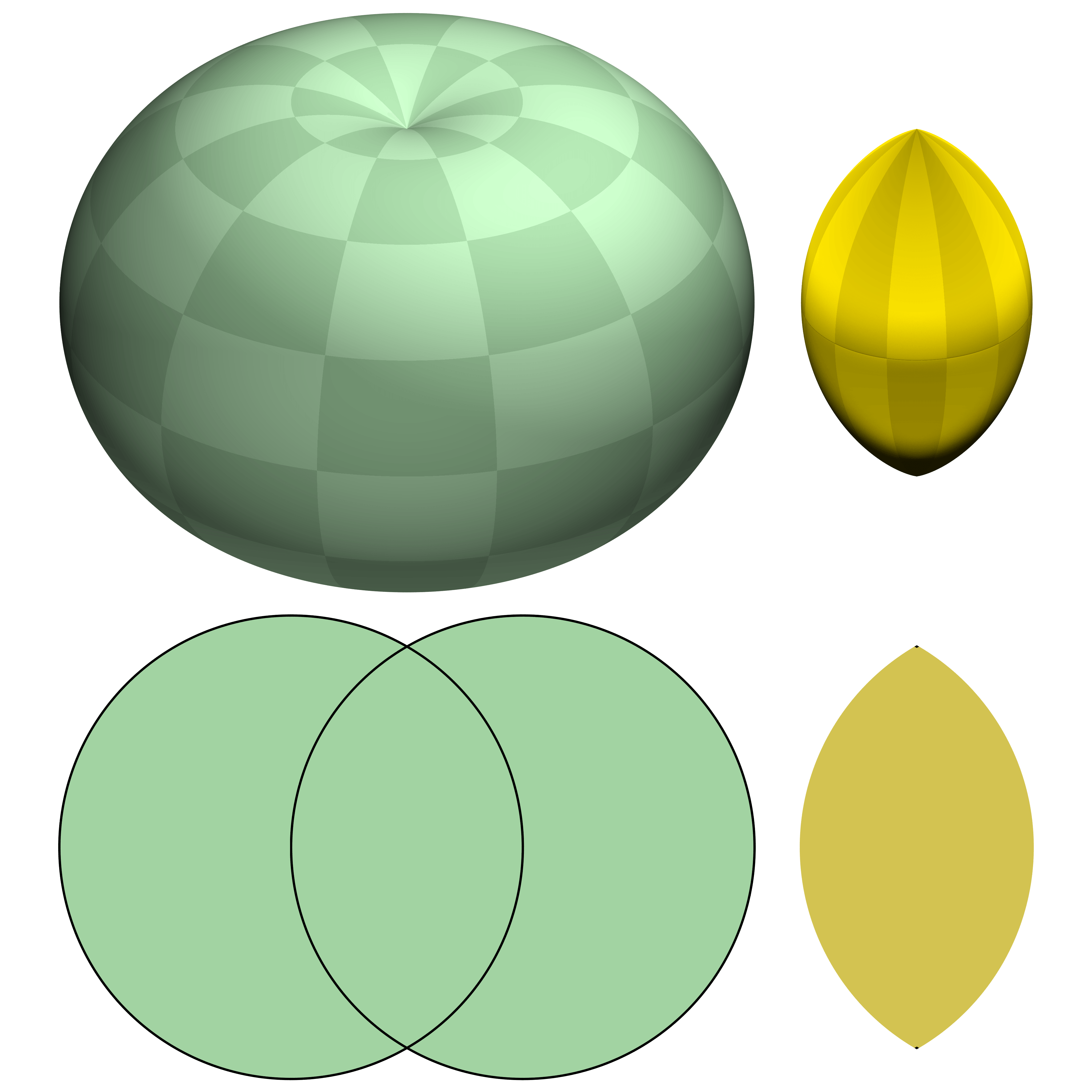
Rotating a lens around its axis yields a lemon (right); its complement is an apple (left)

- Circle–circle intersection
- Lune, a related non-convex shape formed by two circular arcs, one bowing outwards and the other inwards
- Lemon, created by a lens rotated around an axis through its tips.
