= Vesica piscis =

Shape that is the intersection of two circles with the same radius

The vesica piscis is the intersection of two congruent disks, each centered on the perimeter of the other.

The vesica piscis is a type of lens, a mathematical shape formed by the intersection of two disks with the same radius, intersecting in such a way that the center of each disk lies on the perimeter of the other. In Latin, vesica piscis literally means "bladder of a fish", reflecting the shape's resemblance to the conjoined dual air bladders (swim bladder) found in most fish. In Italian, the shape's name is mandorla ("almond"). A similar shape in three dimensions is the lemon.

The vesica piscis in Euclid's Elements

This figure appears in the first proposition of Euclid's Elements, where it forms the first step in constructing an equilateral triangle using a compass and straightedge. The triangle has as its vertices the two disk centers and one of the two sharp corners of the vesica piscis.

== Mathematical description ==
Mathematically, the vesica piscis is a special case of a lens, the shape formed by the intersection of two disks.

The mathematical ratio of the height of the vesica piscis to the width across its center is the square root of 3, or 1.7320508... (since if straight lines are drawn connecting the centers of the two circles with each other and with the two points where the circles intersect, two equilateral triangles join along an edge). The ratios 265:153 = 1.7320261... and 1351:780 = 1.7320513... are two of a series of approximations to this value, each with the property that no better approximation can be obtained with smaller whole numbers. Archimedes of Syracuse, in his Measurement of a Circle, uses these ratios as upper and lower bounds:
$$\frac{1351}{780} > \sqrt{3} > \frac{265}{153}.$$

=== Area ===
The areas in blue – an equilateral triangle and a segment – form together a sector of one sixth of the circle (60°)

The area of the vesica piscis is formed by two equilateral triangles and four equal circular segments. In the drawing, one triangle and one segment appear in blue.

One triangle and one segment form a sector of one sixth of the circle (60°). The area of the sector is then $\frac{1}{6} \pi r^2$.

Since the side of the equilateral triangle has length r, its area is $\frac{\sqrt{3}}{4} r^2$.

The area of the segment is the difference between those two areas:
$$\frac{1}{6} \pi r^2 - \frac{\sqrt 3}{4} r^2.$$
By summing the areas of two triangles and four segments, we obtain the area of the vesica piscis:
$$\frac{1}{6} \left(4\pi - 3\sqrt 3\right)r^2 \approx 1.2284r^2.$$

=== Relation to golden ratio ===
$D$ divides $CX$ in the golden ratio.

If the two circles defining the vesica piscis are each surrounded by two concentric circles of twice the radius, then the two outer circles are tangent to the two inner circles (at the points $E$ and $F$ of the figure). The outer circles also intersect to form a lens, but one with a different angle than the vesica piscis. For these circles, the line segment $\overline{XC}$ from one of the crossing points $C$ of the inner circles to the opposite crossing point $X$ of the outer circles is subdivided in the golden ratio by the point $D$, the second crossing point of the two inner circles.

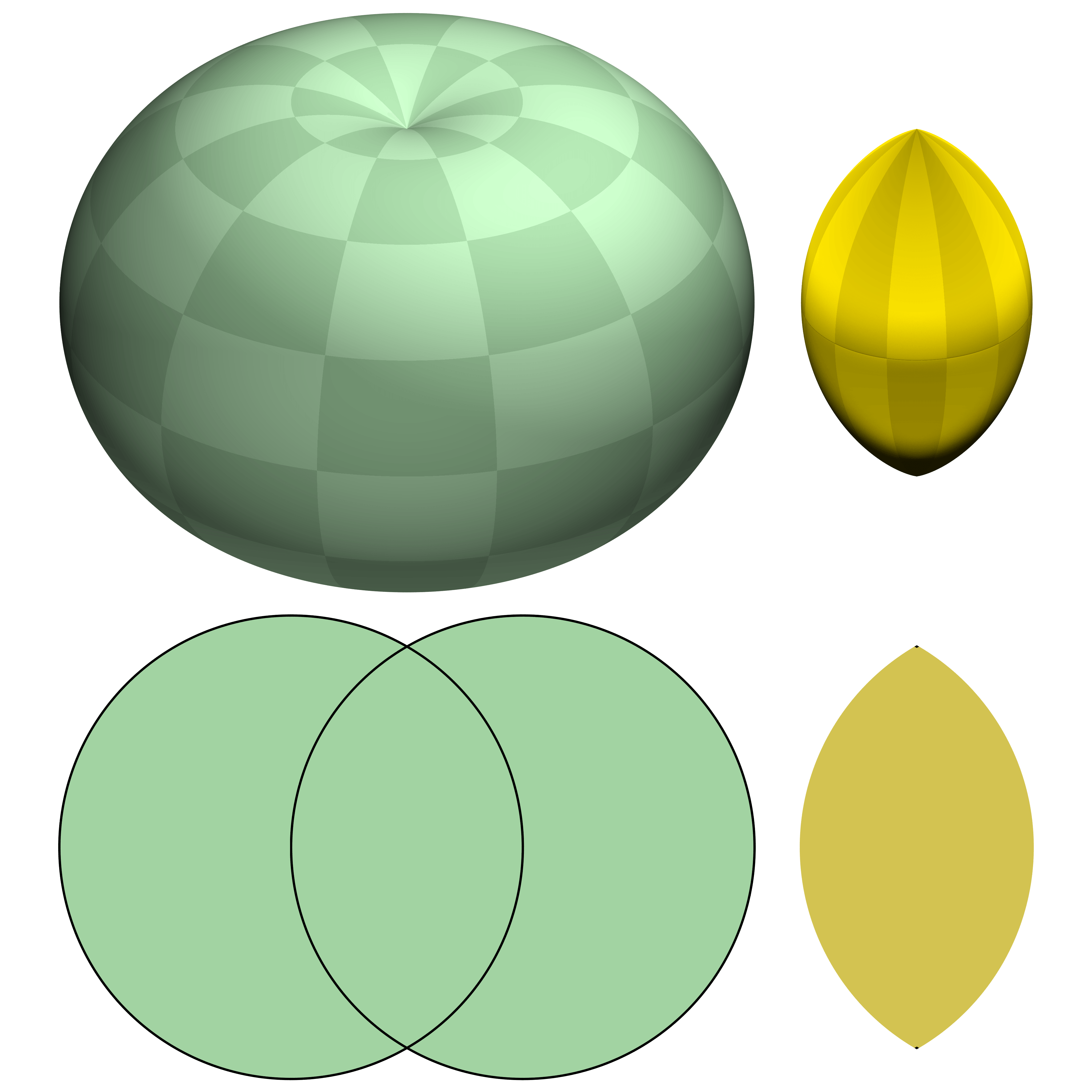
An apple and a lemon derived from a spindle torus with proportions of a vesica piscis

== Applications ==
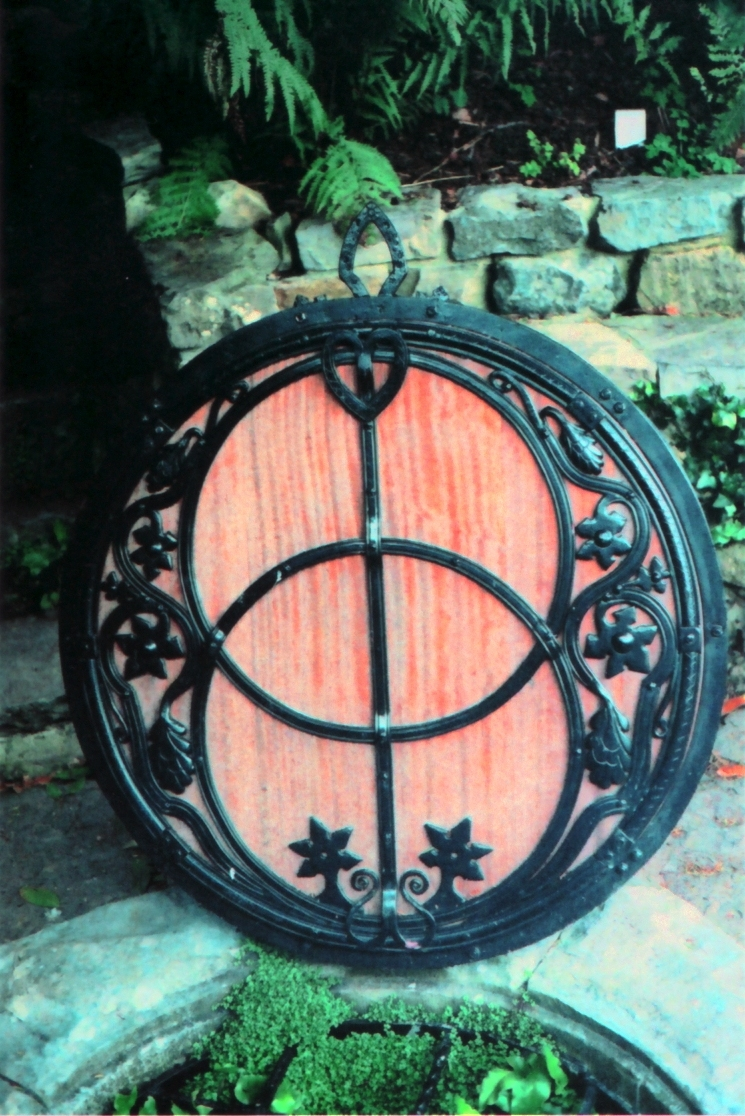
The modern cover of the Chalice Well with an artistic rendering of the vesica piscis

The two circles of the vesica piscis, or three circles forming in pairs three vesicae, are commonly used in Venn diagrams. Arcs of the same three circles can also be used to form the triquetra symbol, and the Reuleaux triangle.

In Christian art, some aureolas are in the shape of a vertically oriented vesica piscis, and the seals of ecclesiastical organizations can be enclosed within a vertically oriented vesica piscis (instead of the more usual circular enclosure). Also, the ichthys symbol incorporates the vesica piscis shape. Ecclesiastical heraldry of the Catholic Church appeared first in seals, nearly all vesica-shaped. The vesica piscis has been used within Freemasonry, most notably in the shapes of the collars worn by officiants of the Masonic rituals. It was also considered the proper shape for the enclosure of the seals of Masonic lodges.

The vesica piscis is also used as a proportioning system in architecture, in particular Gothic architecture. The system was illustrated in Cesare Cesariano's 1521 version of Vitruvius's De architectura, which he called "the rule of the German architects". The vesica piscis was a leitmotif of architect Carlo Scarpa and is used as a "viewing device" in Tomba Brion (Brion Cemetery) in San Vito d'Altivole, Italy.

Several other artworks or designs have also featured this shape:

- The cover of the Chalice Well in Glastonbury (United Kingdom) depicts a stylized version of the vesica piscis design.
- Several mathematical sculptures by Susan Latham use a three-dimensional form obtained from the planar depiction of two circles forming the vesica piscis, deformed into as a curved surface with folds along the inner arcs of the vesica and with the two outer arcs meeting in a single curve. Its shape can be analyzed using the mathematics of developable surfaces.

== Symbolism ==
Various symbolic meanings have been associated with the vesica piscis:

- When arranged so that the lens is horizontal, with its two overlaid circles placed one above the other, it symbolizes the interface between the spiritual and physical worlds, represented by the two circles. In this arrangement, it also resembles the ichthys (fish) symbol for Christ, and has also been said to be a symbol of life, of "the materialization of the spirit", of Christ's mediation between heaven and earth, and of the eucharist.
- When arranged so that the lens is placed vertically, and used to depict a halo or aureola, it represents divine glory.
- When arranged so that the lens is placed vertically, it has also been said to be a depiction of the vulva, and therefore symbolic of femininity and fertility.
- A diagram of Euclid's use of this diagram to construct an equilateral triangle, appearing with the vertical placement of the lens in James Joyce's Finnegans Wake, has been said to be "emblematic of rational man", but overlaid onto a vaginal triangle again symbolizing femininity.

== Gallery ==
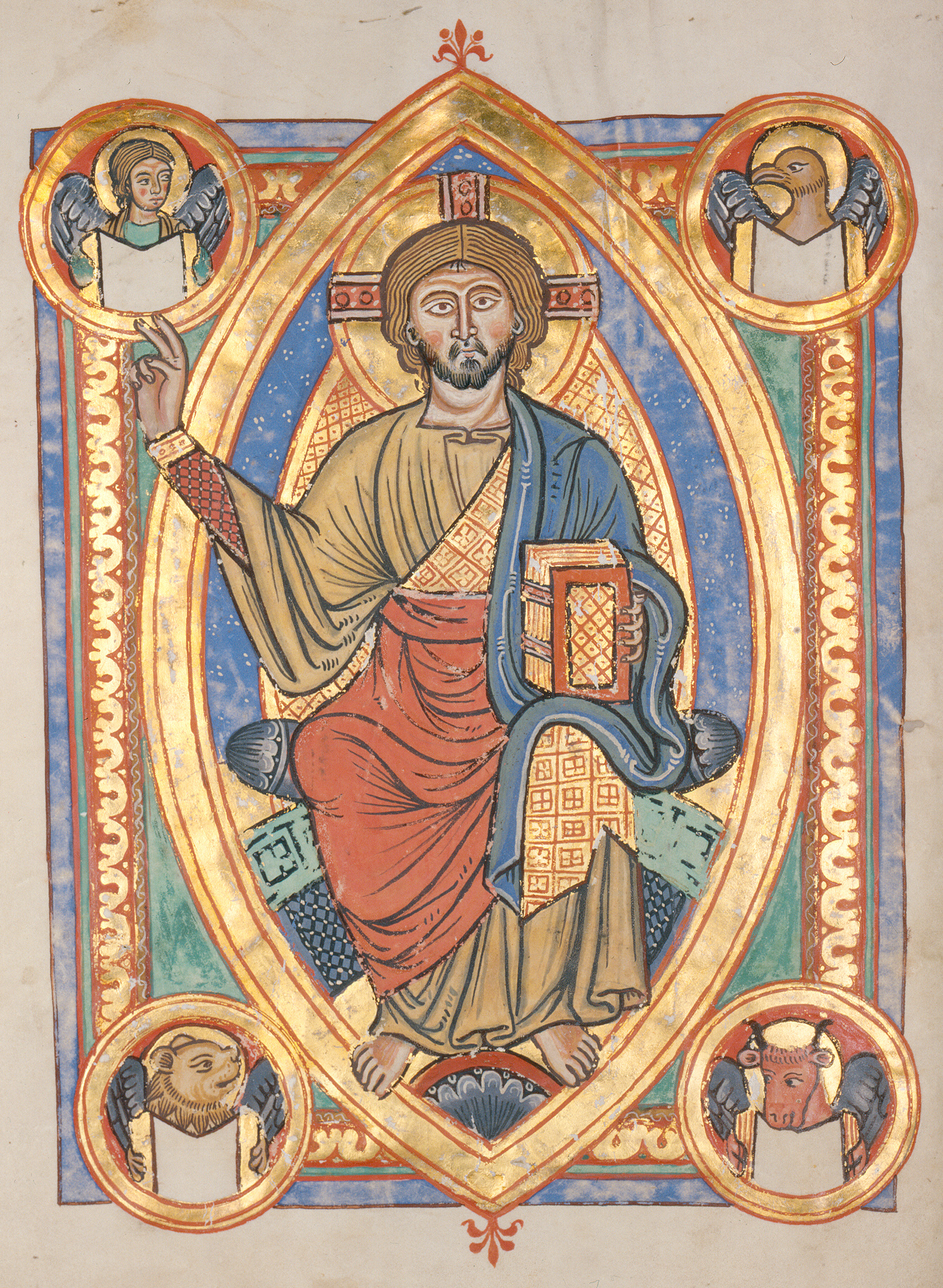
Christ in Majesty within a mandorla-shaped aureola in a medieval illuminated manuscript

Coat of arms of Guam

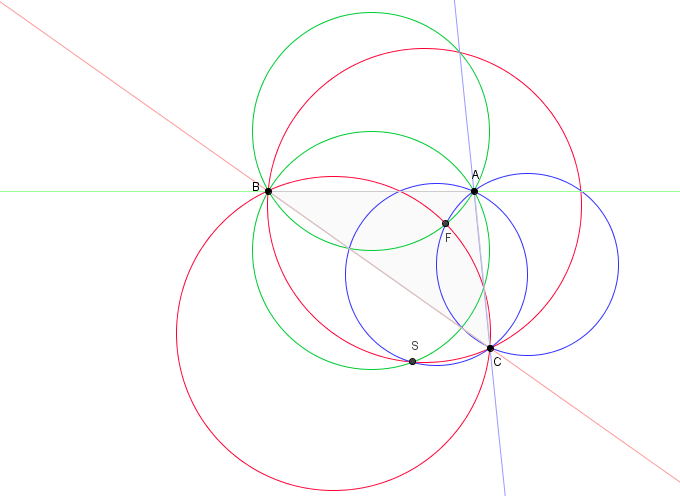
The two isogonic centers of a triangle are the intersections of three vesicae piscis whose paired vertices are the vertices of the triangle

Comparison of associated Reuleaux triangle (red hatching), triquetra (blue) and vesica piscis (teal)

== See also ==
- Flower of Life, a figure based upon this principle
- Lemon (geometry), a similar three-dimensional shape
- Venn diagram, a widely used diagram style that illustrates the logical relation between sets
- Villarceau circles, a pair of congruent circles derived from a torus that, however, are not usually centered on each other's perimeter
