= Lemon (geometry) =

Geometric shape

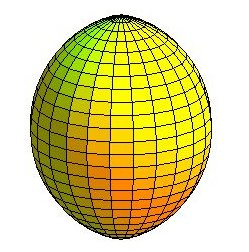
A lemon

In geometry, a lemon is a geometric shape that is constructed as the surface of revolution of a circular arc of angle less than half of a full circle rotated about an axis passing through the endpoints of the lens (or arc). The surface of revolution of the complementary arc of the same circle, through the same axis, is called an apple.

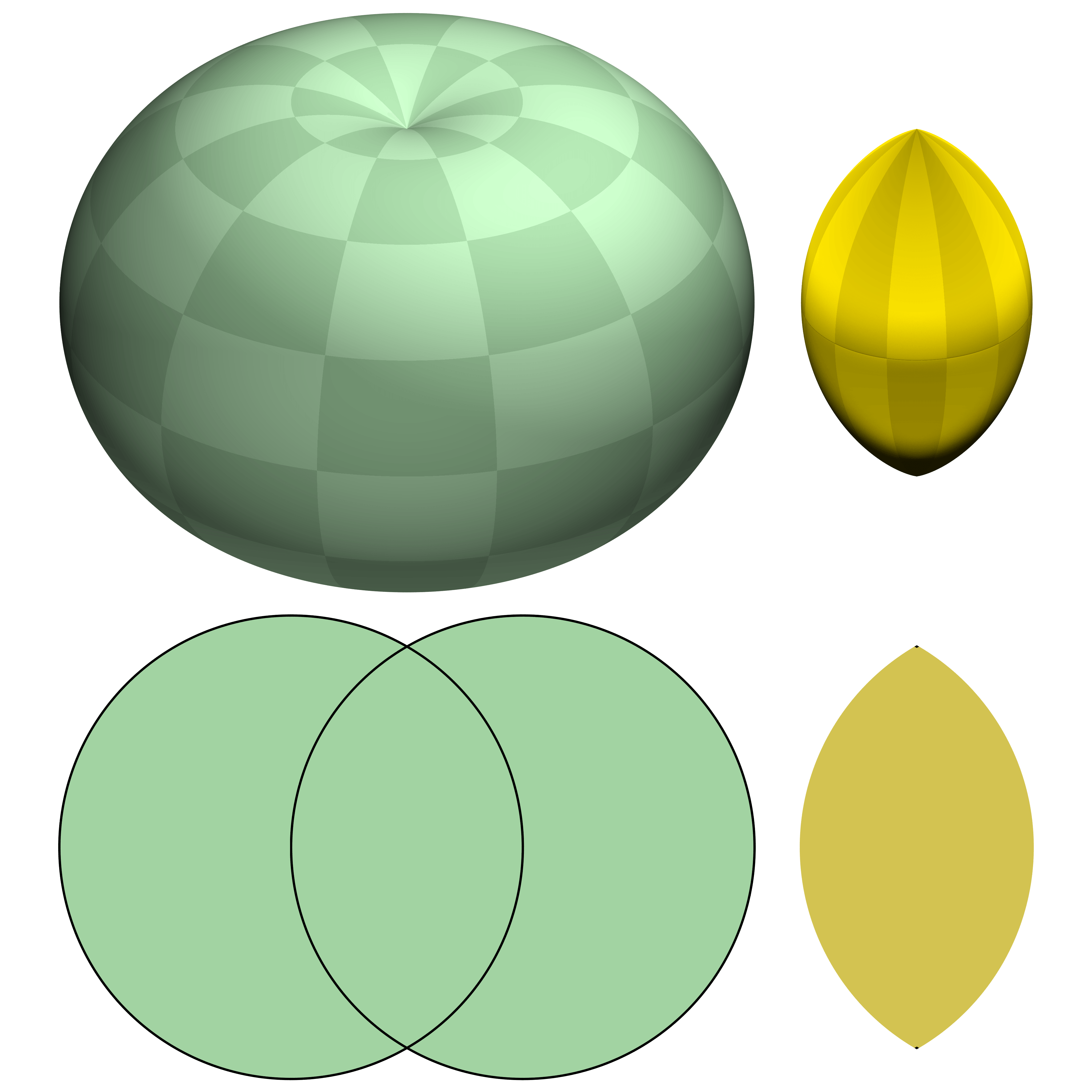
An apple and a lemon derived from a spindle torus with proportions of a vesica piscis

The apple and lemon together make up a spindle torus (or self-crossing torus or self-intersecting torus). The lemon forms the boundary of a convex set, while its surrounding apple is non-convex.

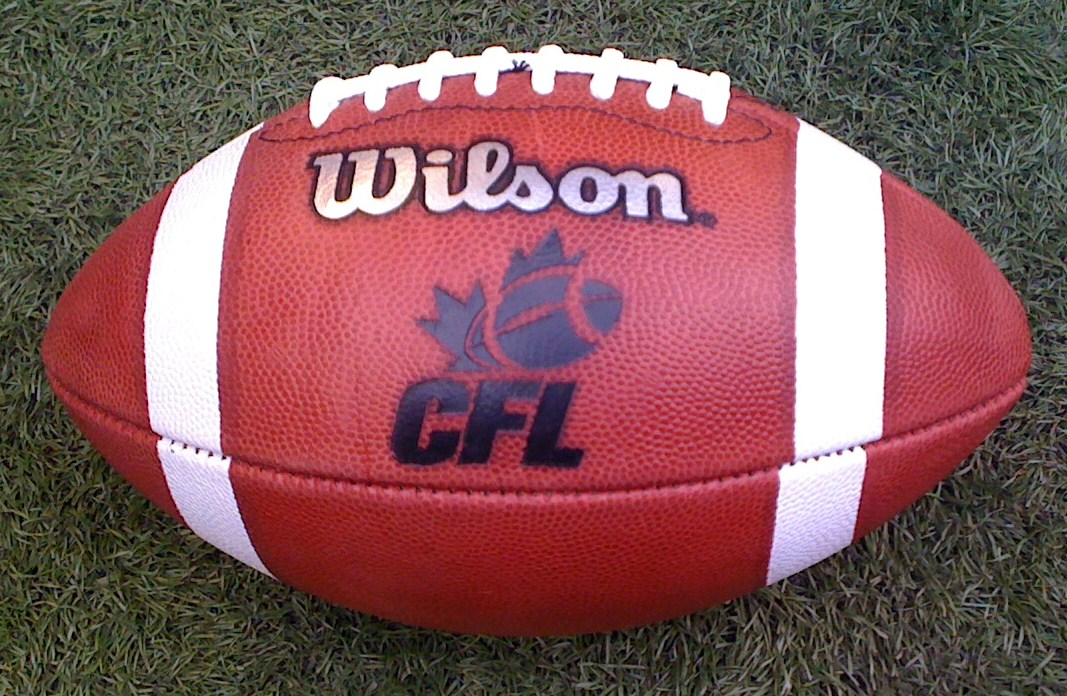
North American football

The ball in North American football has a shape resembling a geometric lemon. However, although used with a related meaning in geometry, the term "football" is more commonly used to refer to a surface of revolution whose Gaussian curvature is positive and constant, formed from a more complicated curve than a circular arc. Alternatively, a football may refer to a more abstract orbifold, a surface modeled locally on a sphere except at two points.

== Area and volume ==
The lemon is generated by rotating an arc of radius $R$ and half-angle $\varphi_m$ less than $\pi/2$ about its chord. Note that $\varphi$ denotes latitude, as used in geophysics. The surface area is given by
$$A = 2\pi R^2 \int_{-\varphi_m}^{\varphi_m} (\cos\varphi - \cos\varphi_m)\,d\varphi.$$

The volume is given by
$$V = \pi R^3 \int_{-\varphi_m}^{\varphi_m} (\cos\varphi - \cos\varphi_m)^2 \cos\varphi \,d\varphi.$$

These integrals can be evaluated analytically, giving
$$A = 4\pi R^2 (\sin\varphi_m - \varphi_m\cos\varphi_m),$$
$$V = \tfrac{4}{3}\pi R^3 \left[\sin^3\varphi_m - \tfrac{3}{4} \cos\varphi_m(2\varphi_m - \sin2\varphi_m)\right].$$

The apple is generated by rotating an arc of half-angle $\varphi_m$ greater than $\pi/2$ about its chord. The above equations are valid for both the lemon and apple.

== See also ==
- List of shapes
- Sears–Haack body
- Vesica piscis
