= Quasi-triangulation =

A quasi-triangulation is a subdivision of a geometric object into simplices, where vertices are not points but arbitrary sloped line segments. This division is not a triangulation in the geometric sense. It is a topological triangulation, however. A quasi-triangulation may have some of the characteristics of a Delaunay triangulation.

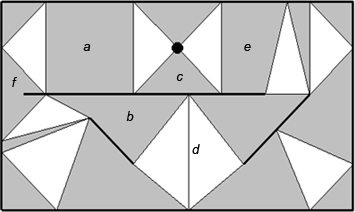
Quasi-triangulation. Line segments of the topology (quasi-vertices) are shown in black, gray — quasi-edges, white — faces. a — a convex quadrangular edge, b — a nonconvex quadrangular edge, c — a triangular edge, d — a degenerate edge, a and e — parallel edges, f — a quasi-edge contains a part of the line segment.
