= Minimum weight =

The minimum weight is a concept used in various branches of mathematics and computer science related to measurement.

- Minimum Hamming weight, a concept in coding theory
- Minimum weight spanning tree
- Minimum-weight triangulation, a topic in computational geometry and computer science

== See also ==
- Minimumweight, or mini flyweight, a weight class in combat sports
