= NGC 568 =

Galaxy in the constellation of Sculptor

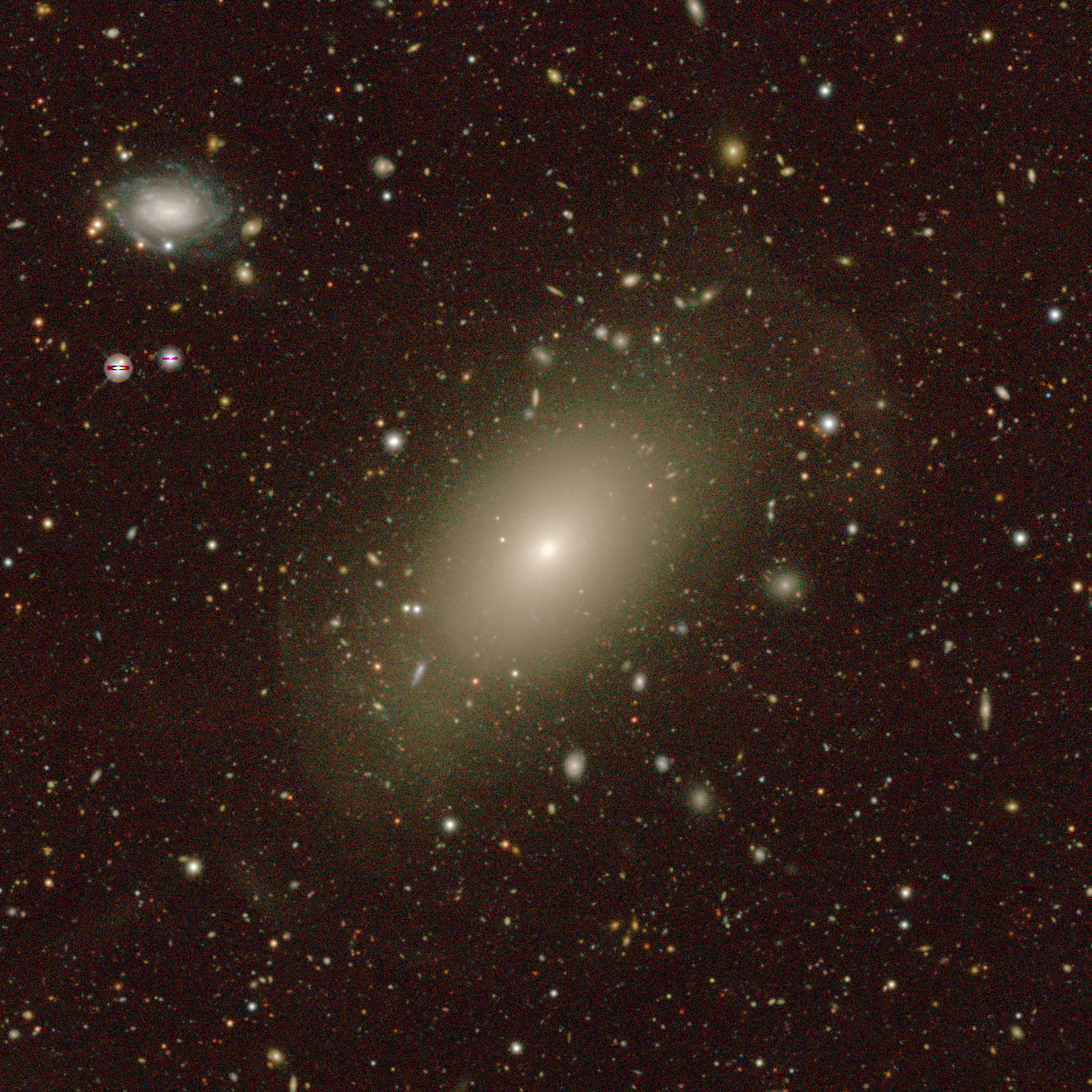

Observation data (J2000 epoch)
- Constellation: Sculptor
- Right ascension: 01^{h} 27^{m} 57.0^{s}
- Declination: −35° 43′ 03″
- Redshift: 0.018823±0.000133
- Heliocentric radial velocity: 5,679 km/s
- Distance: 266 million light-year, 82.41 Mpc
- Apparent magnitude (V): 10.479

Characteristics
- Type: SA0^{−} pec?

Other designations
- IC 1709, ESO 353-3, PGC 5468, 2MASX J01275699-3543039, GSC 07004-01899, MCG-06-04-037, 6dFGS gJ012757.0-354304, 2dFGRS TGS623Z103, ESO-LV 353-0030, SGC 012541-3558.6, LEDA 5468, DUGRS 353-002, APMBGC 353+112+050 and Gaia DR2 5013264743345545088

NGC 568, also commonly referred as IC 1709 is an unbarred lenticular galaxy in the constellation of Sculptor. The galaxy is 266 million light-years from Earth and was discovered by John Herschel on November 29, 1837, and Lewis Swift, an American astronomer who listed it and gave it the name IC 1709 on September 4, 1897.

== See also ==
- List of NGC objects
