= Greedy triangulation =

- Polygon Greedy triangulation steps. On each step a new edge (red) is added joining the nearest pair of vertex, without crossing a previously edge
- Class: Search algorithm
- Data structure: Priority queue; Spatial database
- Worst-case performance: $O(|V| \cdot \log |V|)$
- Best-case performance: $O(|V|)$

The greedy triangulation is a method to compute a polygon triangulation or a point set triangulation using a greedy algorithm, which adds edges one by one to the solution in strict increasing order by length, with the condition that an edge cannot cut a previously inserted edge.
