= Las Campanas Redshift Survey =

1991 astronomical survey

- Website: qold.astro.utoronto.ca/~lin/lcrs.html

The Las Campanas Redshift Survey is considered the first attempt to map a large area of the universe out to a redshift of z = 0.2. It was begun in 1991 using the Las Campanas telescope in Chile to catalog 26418 separate galaxies. It is considered one of the first surveys to document the so-called "end of greatness" where the Cosmological Principle of isotropy could be seen. Superclusters and voids are prominent features in the survey.

== See also ==
- 2dF Galaxy Redshift Survey
- Sloan Digital Sky Survey
