= International Journal for Numerical Methods in Biomedical Engineering =

- Discipline: Numerical modeling in biomedical engineering
- Language: English
- Edited by: Perumal Nithiarasu

Publication details
- History: 1985–present
- Publisher: Wiley
- Frequency: Monthly
- Impact factor: 2.1 (2025)

Standard abbreviations
- ISO 4: Int. J. Numer. Methods Biomed. Eng.

Indexing
- ISSN: 2040-7939 (print); 2040-7947 (web)
- LCCN: 2010254003
- OCLC no.: 669912281

Links
- Journal homepage; Online access; Online archive

International Journal for Numerical Methods in Biomedical Engineering is a peer-reviewed scientific journal co-published monthly by Wiley. Established in 1985, it covers fundamentals and applications of numerical modeling in biomedical engineering. Its editor-in-chief is Perumal Nithiarasu (Swansea University).

== Abstracting and indexing ==
The journal is abstracted and indexed in:

- Current Contents/Engineering, Computing & Technology
- EBSCO databases
- Ei Compendex
- Inspec
- MEDLINE
- ProQuest databases
- Science Citation Index Expanded
- Scopus
- Zentralblatt Math

According to the Journal Citation Reports, the journal has a 2025 impact factor of 2.1.
