= Regular grid =

Tessellation of Euclidean space

Example of a regular grid

A regular grid is a tessellation of n-dimensional Euclidean space by congruent parallelotopes (e.g. bricks). Its opposite is irregular grid.

Grids of this type appear on graph paper and may be used in finite element analysis, finite volume methods, finite difference methods, and in general for discretization of parameter spaces. Since the derivatives of field variables can be conveniently expressed as finite differences, structured grids mainly appear in finite difference methods. Unstructured grids offer more flexibility than structured grids and hence are very useful in finite element and finite volume methods.

Each cell in the grid can be addressed by index (i, j) in two dimensions or (i, j, k) in three dimensions, and each vertex has coordinates $(i\cdot dx, j\cdot dy)$ in 2D or $(i\cdot dx, j\cdot dy, k\cdot dz)$ in 3D for some real numbers dx, dy, and dz representing the grid spacing.

== Related grids ==
A Cartesian grid is a special case where the elements are unit squares or unit cubes, and the vertices are points on the integer lattice.

A rectilinear grid is a tessellation by rectangles or rectangular cuboids (also known as rectangular parallelepipeds) that are not, in general, all congruent to each other. The cells may still be indexed by integers as above, but the mapping from indexes to vertex coordinates is less uniform than in a regular grid. An example of a rectilinear grid that is not regular appears on logarithmic scale graph paper.

A skewed grid is a tessellation of parallelograms or parallelepipeds. (If the unit lengths are all equal, it is a tessellation of rhombi or rhombohedra.)

A curvilinear grid or structured grid is a grid with the same combinatorial structure as a regular grid, in which the cells are quadrilaterals or [general] cuboids, rather than rectangles or rectangular cuboids.

Examples of various grids
3-D Cartesian grid

3-D rectilinear grid

2-D curvilinear grid

Non-curvilinear combination of different 2-D curvilinear grids

2-D triangular grid.

== See also ==
- Cartesian coordinate system – Most common coordinate system (geometry)
- Integer lattice – Lattice group in Euclidean space whose points are integer n-tuples
- Unstructured grid – Unstructured (or irregular) grid is a tessellation of a part of the Euclidean plane
- Discretization – Conversion of continuous functions into discrete counterparts
