= Function representation =

Function Representation (FRep or F-Rep) is used in solid modeling, volume modeling and computer graphics. FRep was introduced in "Function representation in geometric modeling: concepts, implementation and applications" as a uniform representation of multidimensional geometric objects (shapes). An object as a point set in multidimensional space is defined by a single continuous real-valued function $f(X)$ of point coordinates $X[x_1,x_2, ..., x_n]$ which is evaluated at the given point by a procedure traversing a tree structure with primitives in the leaves and operations in the nodes of the tree. The points with $f(x_1,x_2, ..., x_n) \ge 0$ belong to the object, and the points with $f(x_1,x_2, ..., x_n) < 0$ are outside of the object. The point set with $f(x_1,x_2, ..., x_n)=0$ is called an isosurface.

== Geometric domain ==
The geometric domain of FRep in 3D space includes solids with non-manifold models and lower-dimensional entities (surfaces, curves, points) defined by zero value of the function. A primitive can be defined by an equation or by a "black box" procedure converting point coordinates into the function value. Solids bounded by algebraic surfaces, skeleton-based implicit surfaces, and convolution surfaces, as well as procedural objects (such as solid noise), and voxel objects can be used as primitives (leaves of the construction tree). In the case of a voxel object (discrete field), it should be converted to a continuous real function, for example, by applying the trilinear or higher-order interpolation.

Many operations such as set-theoretic, blending, offsetting, projection, non-linear deformations, metamorphosis, sweeping, hypertexturing, and others, have been formulated for this representation in such a manner that they yield continuous real-valued functions as output, thus guaranteeing the closure property of the representation. R-functions originally introduced in V.L. Rvachev's "On the analytical description of some geometric objects", provide $C^k$ continuity for the functions exactly defining the set-theoretic operations (min/max functions are a particular case). Because of this property, the result of any supported operation can be treated as the input for a subsequent operation; thus very complex models can be created in this way from a single functional expression. FRep modeling is supported by the special-purpose language HyperFun.

== Shape Models ==
FRep combines and generalizes different shape models like

- algebraic surfaces
- skeleton based "implicit" surfaces
- set-theoretic solids or CSG (Constructive Solid Geometry)
- sweeps
- volumetric objects
- parametric models
- procedural models

A more general "constructive hypervolume" allows for modeling multidimensional point sets with attributes (volume models in 3D case). Point set geometry and attributes have independent representations but are treated uniformly. A point set in a geometric space of an arbitrary dimension is an FRep based geometric model of a real object. An attribute that is also represented by a real-valued function (not necessarily continuous) is a mathematical model of an object property of an arbitrary nature (material, photometric, physical, medicine, etc.). The concept of "implicit complex" proposed in "Cellular-functional modeling of heterogeneous objects" provides a framework for including geometric elements of different dimensionality by combining polygonal, parametric, and FRep components into a single cellular-functional model of a heterogeneous object.

== See also ==
- Boundary representation
- Constructive Solid Geometry
- Solid modeling
- Isosurface
- Signed distance function
- HyperFun
- Digital materialization
