= Digital materialization =

Digital materialization (DM) can loosely be defined as two-way direct communication or conversion between matter and information that enables people to exactly describe, monitor, manipulate and create any arbitrary real object. DM is a general paradigm alongside a specified framework that is suitable for computer processing and includes: holistic, coherent, volumetric modeling systems; symbolic languages that are able to handle infinite degrees of freedom and detail in a compact format; and the direct interaction and/or fabrication of any object at any spatial resolution without the need for “lossy” or intermediate formats.

DM systems possess the following attributes:

- realistic - correct spatial mapping of matter to information
- exact - exact language and/or methods for input from and output to matter
- infinite - ability to operate at any scale and define infinite detail
- symbolic - accessible to individuals for design, creation and modification

Such an approach can not only be applied to tangible objects but can include the conversion of things such as light and sound to/from information and matter. Systems to digitally materialize light and sound already largely exist now (e.g. photo editing, audio mixing, etc.) and have been quite effective - but the representation, control and creation of tangible matter is poorly support by computational and digital systems.

Commonplace computer-aided design and manufacturing systems currently represent real objects as "2.5 dimensional" shells. In contrast, DM proposes a deeper understanding and sophisticated manipulation of matter by directly using rigorous mathematics as complete volumetric descriptions of real objects. By utilizing technologies such as Function representation (FRep) it becomes possible to compactly describe and understand the surface and internal structures or properties of an object at an infinite resolution. Thus models can accurately represent matter across all scales making it possible to capture the complexity and quality of natural and real objects and ideally suited for digital fabrication and other kinds of real world interactions. DM surpasses the previous limitations of static disassociated languages and simple human-made objects, to propose systems that are heterogeneous, interacting directly and more naturally with the complex world.

Digital and computer-based languages and processes, unlike the analogue counterparts, can computationally and spatially describe and control matter in an exact, constructive and accessible manner. However, this requires approaches that can handle the complexity of natural objects and materials.

== See also ==
- Function representation
- Constructive Solid Geometry
- Isosurface
- Solid modeling
- 3D printing
- Additive manufacturing
- Rapid prototyping
- Molecular assembler
- RepRap
