= Alexei Severinsky =

American inventor

Alexander "Alex" J. Severinsky is an American engineer immigrated from post-Soviet Russia. He graduated with Master of Science degree from the Kharkiv National University of Radioelectronics in 1967 and got his Candidate of Science degree (Ph.D.) in Electrical Engineering from Institute for Precision Measurements in Radioelectronics and Physics in Moscow in 1975. Before the emigration he worked in Kharkiv, Ukraine. Severinsky emigrated from the Soviet Union to the United States in 1978.

Severinsky is the inventor of the Hyperdrive power-amplified internal combustion engine power train. He patented this invention in 1994. The system is used in hybrid cars, in particular in the Toyota Prius. Severinsky is the founder and Chairman Emeritus of Paice, which licenses the Hyperdrive to hybrid vehicle manufacturers. On August 16, 2006, a U.S. federal judge required Toyota to pay Alex Severinsky $25 for every Prius II, Highlander Hybrid and Lexus RX400h hybrid sold in the United States. On 21 July 2010 Severinsky and Toyota agreed on a settlement.

Severinsky is also the inventor of the Fuelcor technology - a patented technology for recycling carbon monoxide and carbon dioxide emissions into usable fuel products. Fuelcor's technology is marketed by Fuelcor International, LLC, a Virginia-based intellectual property development and management company, which was founded after Severinsky resigned as CEO of Paice in 2006.

Severinsky holds 30 patents in the United States with numerous patent filings in countries worldwide. Severinsky is a Senior Member of Institute of Electrical and Electronics Engineers (IEEE).
