= US Radar =

American radar manufacturer and distributor

- Company type: Privately held company
- Industry: Ground Penetrating Radar, Underground Locating
- Founded: 1994
- Headquarters: Morganville, New Jersey, United States
- Number of employees: 50+
- Website: www.usradar.com

US Radar is a manufacturer and distributor of Surface Penetrating Radar (SPR), also known as ground penetrating radar (GPR) systems.

== History ==
US Radar Inc. is a manufacturer and innovator of ground penetrating radar technology and equipment. The company was formed in 1994 as the sales and marketing partner for the Americas for ERA Technology of Leatherhead, Surrey, England.

The parent firm had developed various subsurface detection systems since its founding in 1920, and developed one of the first modern ground penetrating radar systems in the early 1980s. The original purpose for this technology was to locate plastic landmines as part of a British Ministry of Defence contract. Commercial versions of the technology were developed in 1990 after making adjustments to work for the private sector.

In 2002, ERA Technology's Ground Penetrating Radar (GPR) division was acquired by US Radar including manufacturing and engineering capabilities, worldwide customer marketing, support and service. All facilities and many personnel were then relocated to USA.

== Technology ==
Ground penetrating radar is similar in concept to a metal detector. The technology works by slowly moving the unit over a non-conductive surface. The antenna sends out ultra-wide spectrum RF energy pulses though the surface which then get reflected back to the antenna to create an image and display it on the unit’s screen. The ultra-wide spectrum RF energy is safe to both the unit operator as well as the area under investigation. The depth range of GPR is limited by the electrical conductivity of the ground, the transmitted frequency range and the radiated power.

Unlike metal detectors, which can only detect specific materials, ground penetrating radar images the entirety of the subsurface within range. The extent of imaging capabilities are subject to soil conditions and strength of a system's antenna. While the GPR system will not show an outline of a detected object, it will display the presence of an object, void, or disturbance in the soil in the form of an arch-shaped hyperbola. From there, the operator or other analyst can examine the data and determine the nature of their findings.

US Radar systems like the Quantum Imager feature a unique triple frequency antenna that sends three signals through the soil simultaneously. This generates three separate datasets for low, mid, and high frequency ranges. The data is gathered and displayed through each system's Acquisition Software and can be post-processed in a variety of ways depending on user needs.

== Hardware ==
The type of hardware used will vary based on the type of work involved. For example, a unit to locate utilities and for geophysical applications will need to map anywhere from 15 feet to 100 feet. The frequency range for this type of ground penetrating radar equipment is 10-2300 MHz with a peak frequency between 100 and 1000 MHz and pulse duration of 0.2 to 4.0 ns. More than 50,000 lineal feet of data can be collected and stored in the US Radar unit before being transferred via USB port to a Windows-based operating system that processes and filters the information. The field units also filter and process in realtime.

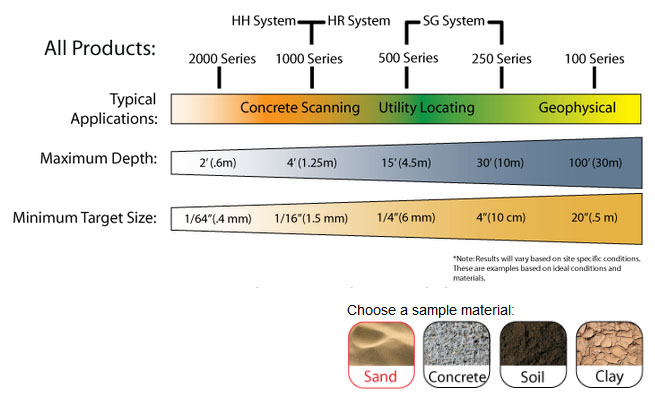
A chart showing different underground utility locating cart systems.

3D mapping can be accomplished when several individual passes are combined and interpolated. All of the systems and antennas manufactured by US Radar are capable of having their data presented in 3D format with the appropriate software packages. When using a 3D software equipped unit, the software can generate depth slice overlays, point clouds, and isosurface models.
