= Rvachev function =

Real-valued mathematical function

In mathematics, an R-function, or Rvachev function, is a real-valued function whose sign does not change if none of the signs of its arguments change; that is, its sign is determined solely by the signs of its arguments.

Interpreting positive values as true and negative values as false, an R-function is transformed into a "companion" Boolean function (the two functions are called friends). For instance, the R-function ƒ(x, y) = min(x, y) is one possible friend of the logical conjunction (AND). R-functions are used in computer graphics and geometric modeling in the context of implicit surfaces and the function representation. They also appear in certain boundary-value problems, and are also popular in certain artificial intelligence applications, where they are used in pattern recognition.

R-functions were first proposed by Vladimir Logvinovich Rvachev (Russian: Влади́мир Логвинович Рвачёв) in 1963, though the name, "R-functions", was given later on by Ekaterina L. Rvacheva-Yushchenko, in memory of their father, Logvin Fedorovich Rvachev (Russian: Логвин Фёдорович Рвачёв).

== See also ==
- Function representation
