= Paice (company) =

- Native name: Paice LLC
- Type: LLC
- Industry: Automotive
- Founded: 1992
- Founder: Alexei Severinsky
- Headquarters: Baltimore, Maryland, United States
- Number of locations: 1
- Key people: Frances Keenan (Executive Chairman)
- Website: www.paicehybrid.com

Paice is a hybrid technology company headquartered in Baltimore. The company develops transitory technology for gas-driven and electricity-driven vehicles.

== Company ==
Paice was founded by Alexei Severinsky, a Russian emigrant, in 1992. Paice originally developed early hybrid-electric powertrain concepts for passenger vehicles. In recent years, Paice LLC has been controlled by the Abell Foundation and has focused on patent litigation. Paice has sued Toyota, Ford, and most recently Hyundai for allegedly infringing on its patents.

=== Field of Operation ===
Paice develops hybrid vehicle drivetrains used in the automotive industry. Hybrid technology developed by Paice are applied in various vehicles such as the Toyota Prius, Ford C-MAX, and Porsche Cayenne E-Hybrid. Besides development marketing, the company also focuses on defending its patents.

== Patents ==
Paice holds about 29 patents that are related to hybrid vehicle drivetrains.

Core patents are:

- Paice US patent 6.209.672, Hybrid car with two electric motors, one connected to engine, and one connected to car wheels, 1998.
- Paice US-Patent 5.343.970, Improved hybrid electric vehicle where both engine and electric motor power the car, and energy is captured via regenerative braking, 1992.
- Paice US patent 6.338.391, Electric motor coupled to turbocharged motor, and control system, 1999.

=== Patent Conflicts ===
The company has patent conflicts with Hyundai because of its Hyundai Sonata Hybrid, and Kia, because of its Kia Optima hybrid car. Millions of dollars of compensation have been successfully claimed.

Similar claims against Ford in 7 of 25 patent appeals by Ford ended up in final decisions by the US patent office USPTAB in favor of Paice. Further decisions are in progress.

=== Lost Claims ===
Paice's claims were backed by the Abell Foundation, a risk capital partner.

In 2016 Paice said that VW, Audi, and Porsche used Paice patented technology infringing Paice's patents. This dispute was settled in early 2017 and the terms of the settlement are confidential.

== See also ==
- Hybrid electric vehicle
- Hybrid vehicle drivetrain
