= Valerii Semenets =

- Валерій Васильович Семенець
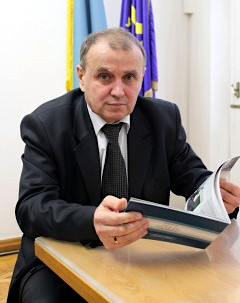
- Valerii Semenets

Personal details
- Born: 26 January 1955 (age 71) Hrebinka
- Citizenship: Ukraine
- Education: Kharkiv National University of Radioelectronics
- Occupation: Rector
- Website: https://nure.ua/en/staff/valerii-semenets

Valerii V. Semenets (Ukrainian: Валерій Васильович Семенець; born January 26, 1955, in Hrebinka) – rector of the Kharkiv National University of Radioelectronics, head of Academic Council, head of Admission Board, professor of MTE Department, member of the specialized scientific council, Doctor of Technical Sciences, Professor.

== Biography ==
1980 — graduated with honors from the Kharkiv institute of Radio Electronics, the diploma project "Logic Modules and Amplifiers of Information Converters".

1984 — PhD thesis "Methods and Algorithms for Optimizing the Allocation of Heat Sources in Multi-crystalline Microassemblies, Taking into Account the Conditions for Tracing Electrical Connections."

1992 — Doctoral thesis "Theoretical Foundations of Automated Design of Technical Systems based on Multicrystal Chips".

1994 – Professor at the Biomedical Electronics Department.

2003—2012 – Vice-rector of the Kharkiv National University of Radioelectronics.

2017 — Rector of the Kharkiv National University of Radioelectronics.

== Scientific activities ==
In 1997, at the Department of Biomedical Electronic Devices and Systems Professor Semenets created a research group on the development of biomedical equipment and multifunctional microprocessor systems. Twenty years ago, he founded a scientific school of microprocessor medical systems, which today leading of the professor O.G. Avrunin develops multifunctional microprocessor systems in medicine. Under the supervision of Valerii Semenets defended 3 doctoral dissertations and 8 PhD theses.

In 2004—2005 under his leadership a set of multifunctional laboratory stands was created, which includes microcontrollers, signal processors, programmable integrated circuits, on the basis of which various autonomous control systems are developed. The complex is used not only in NURE, but also in many universities in Ukraine.

In 2007—2012 under the guidance of Valerii Semenets, a hardware-software complex of high-precision neurosurgical interventions and functional diagnostics of external respiration was created. The complex is used in the neurosurgical and otorhinolaryngology departments of the Kharkiv Regional Clinical Hospital.

In 2010—2012 for the first time in Ukraine under the leadership of Valerii Semenets developed and created a unique installation for remote conducting of laboratory works on technical disciplines. Used today in the distance learning.

Scientific interests – CAD of electronic and medical devices.

He is the editor-in-chief of journals "Automated control systems and automation devices", "Innovative technologies and scientific solutions for industries". He is IEEE member, chairman and a member of the organization and program committees of numerous international scientific conferences, such as TCSET, CAOL. Head of the Academic Council Kharkiv National University of Radioelectronics.

== Scientific work ==
Author of more than 300 scientific publications, among which 49 learning books, 7 monographs, 65 patents.

Monographs:

- Семенець В. В. Оптимизационные методы и алгоритмы автоматизированного конструирования микроэлектронных устройств. – Киев: Вища школа, 1992. – 45 с. (in Russian)
- Добрускин М.Е., Богомолов С.И. Семенець В. В. и др. Инженер ХХI века: личность и профессионал в свете гуманизации высшего технического образования. — Харьков: "Рубикон", 1999. — 512 с. (in Russian)
- Сінотін А. М., Колеснікова Т. А., Семенець В. В. Проектування одноблокових радіоелектронних приладів із заданим тепловим режимом. – Харків: ХНУРЕ, 2006. – 172 с. (in Ukrainian)
- Басманов А. Є., Дікарєв В. А., Семенець В. В. Неоднорідні марковські процеси та деякі їх застосування. Фокусування й синтез. – Харків : ХНУРЕ, 2009. – 240 с. (in Ukrainian)
- Аврунін О.Г., Бодянський Є.В., Калашник М.В., Філатов В.О., Семенець В. В. Сучасні інтелектуальні технології функціональної медичної діагностики. – Харків : ХНУРЕ, 2018. – 236 с. (in Ukrainian)
- Аврунін О.Г., Безшапочний С.Б., Бодянський Є.В., Філатов В.О., Семенець В. В. Інтелектуальні технології моделювання хірургічних втручань. – Харків : ХНУРЕ, 2018. – 224 с. (in Ukrainian)
- Аврунін О.Г., Бодянський Є.В., Філатов В.О.,Шушляпіна Н.О., Семенець В. В. Інформаційні технології підтримки прийняття рішень при визначенні порушень носового дихання. – Харків: ХНУРЕ, 2018. – 132 с. (in Ukrainian)

Learning books:

- Кратц Д., Невлюдов И.Ш., Палагин В.А., Семенець В. В. Технология межсоединений электронной аппаратуры. Учебник. — Харьков: Компания СМИТ, 2005. — 432 c. (in Russian)
- Невлюдов І.Ш., Палагін В.А., Семенець В. В. Введення в мікросистемну техніку та нанотехнології. Підручник. — Харків: ТОВ "Компанія СМІТ", 2011. — 415 c. (in Ukrainian)
- Бондаренко М.Ф., Шкляров Л.Й., Семенець В. В. Математика (алгебра) для вступників до вузів. Навч. посібник. — Харків: ХНУРЕ, 2008. — 410 c. (in Ukrainian)
- Кармазин В.В., Семенець В. В. Курс загальної фізики. Навч. посібник. — К.: Кондор, 2009. — 786 c. (in Ukrainian)
- Дорошенко В.О., Сова Г.В., Семенець В. В. Елементи вищої математики для підготовчих відділень: навч. посібник для абітурієнтів та студентів технічних спеціальностей. Навч. посібник. — Харків: ХНУРЕ, 2010. — 400 c. (in Ukrainian)
- Аврунін О.Г., Запорожець О.В., Носова Т.В., Семенець В. В. Микропроцессоры в информационно-измерительных системах. Навч. посібник. — Харків: ХНУРЕ, 2015. — 180 c. (in Russian)

== Social activities ==
1998–1999 – expert of EU project TEMPUS, Jyväskylä, Finland.

1999 — supervisor of the student internship programme DAAD at the German enterprises.

2001 — head of the delegation to establish partnerships with universities in Guangzhou, People's Republic of China.

2003 — Bethlehem. Project coordinator, U.S. Department of State "A Partnership for Educational and Technical Change".

2004 — Baku, Azerbaijan. Project coordinator, U.S. Department of State "A Partnership for Educational and Technical Change".

2009—2014 — member of the Coordinating Council of the Ukraine Ministry of Education and Science for the students with disabilities training.

Since 2017 — Heads the official international delegations partnerships in education and research with universities Poland, France, People's Republic of China, Latvia and other countries.

== Awards and honours ==
2008 – State Prize of Ukraine in the field of science and technology for the work "Financial Management System in the field of Education and Science".

1999 – "Excellence in Education of Ukraine".
