= Metaballs =

N-dimensional isosurfaces which can meld together

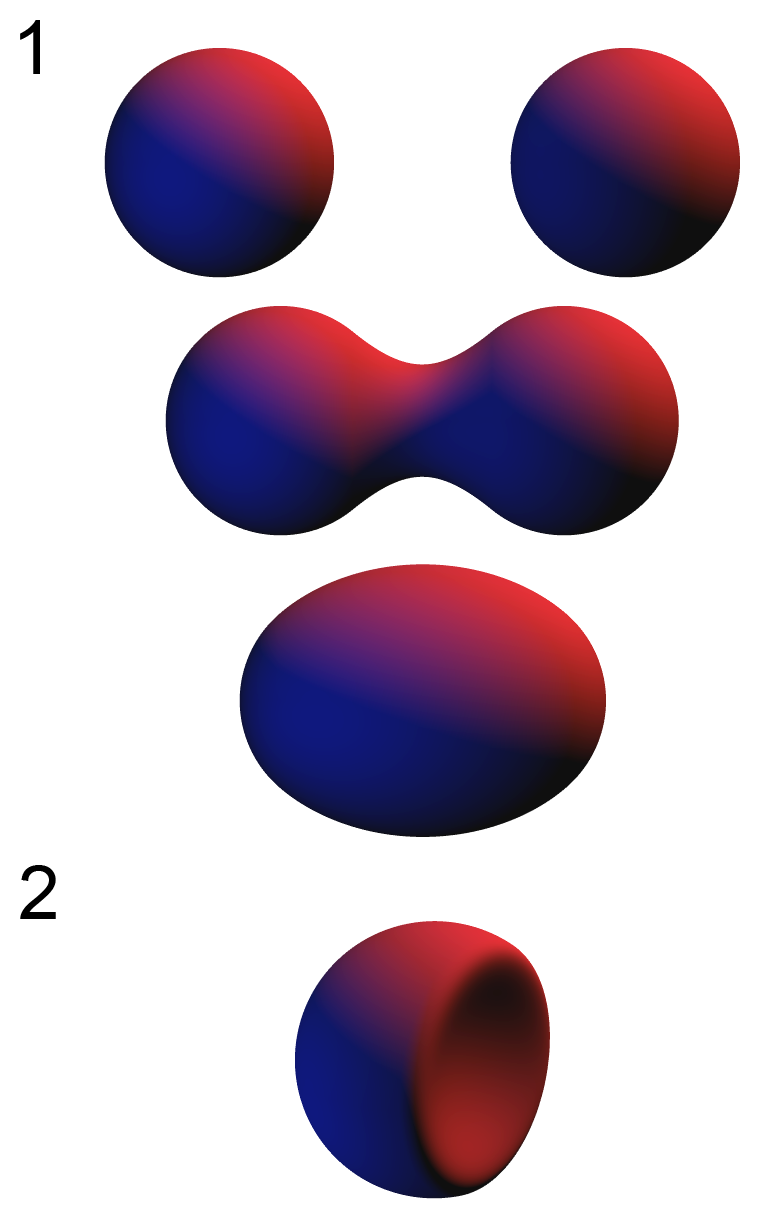
1: The influence of 2 positive metaballs on each other. 2: The influence of a negative metaball on a positive metaball by creating an indentation in the positive metaball's surface.

In computer graphics, metaballs, also known as blobby objects, are organic-looking n-dimensional isosurfaces, characterised by their ability to meld together when in close proximity to create single, contiguous objects.

In solid modelling, polygon meshes are commonly used. In certain instances, however, metaballs are superior. A metaball's "blobby" appearance makes them versatile tools, often used to model organic objects and also to create base meshes for sculpting.

The technique for rendering metaballs was invented by Jim Blinn in the early 1980s to model atom interactions for Carl Sagan's 1980 TV series Cosmos. It is also referred to colloquially as the "jelly effect" in the motion and UX design community, commonly appearing in UI elements such as navigations and buttons.

== Definition ==
Each metaball is defined as a function in n dimensions (e.g., for three dimensions, $f(x,y,z)$; three-dimensional metaballs tend to be most common, with two-dimensional implementations popular as well). A thresholding value is also chosen, to define a solid volume. Then,

$$\sum_{i} \mbox{metaball}_i(x,y,z) \geq \mbox{threshold}$$

that is, all points larger than the threshold are inside the metaball.

== Implementation ==
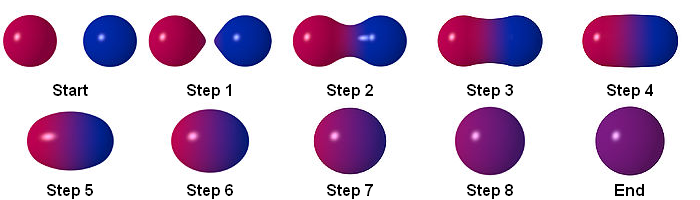
The interaction between two differently colored 3D positive metaballs, created in Bryce. Note that the two smaller metaballs combine to create one larger object.

A typical function chosen for metaballs is simply inverse distance, that is, the contribution to the thresholding function falls off asymptotically toward zero as the distance from the center of the metaball increases:

$$f(r) = \frac{a}{r}$$

where $a$ scales the magnitude of the contribution (changing the radius of a metaball) and $r$ is the distance from the ball's center, calculated from Cartesian coordinates as:

$$r = \sqrt{(x-x_0)^2 + (y-y_0)^2 + (z-z_0)^2}$$

where $(x_0, y_0, z_0)$ is the center of the metaball.

Various other falloff functions have historically been used for reasons of computational efficiency. Desirable properties of the function include:

- Finite support. A function with finite support goes to zero at a maximum radius. When evaluating the metaball field, any points beyond their maximum radius from the sample point can be ignored. Nearest neighbor search can ensure only adjacent metaballs need to be evaluated regardless of the total number in the field.
- Smoothness. Because the isosurface is the result of adding the fields together, its smoothness is dependent on the smoothness of the falloff curves.

More complicated models use an inverse square law, or a Gaussian potential constrained to a finite radius or a mixture of polynomials to achieve smoothness. The Soft Object model by the Wyvill brothers provides higher degree of smoothness.

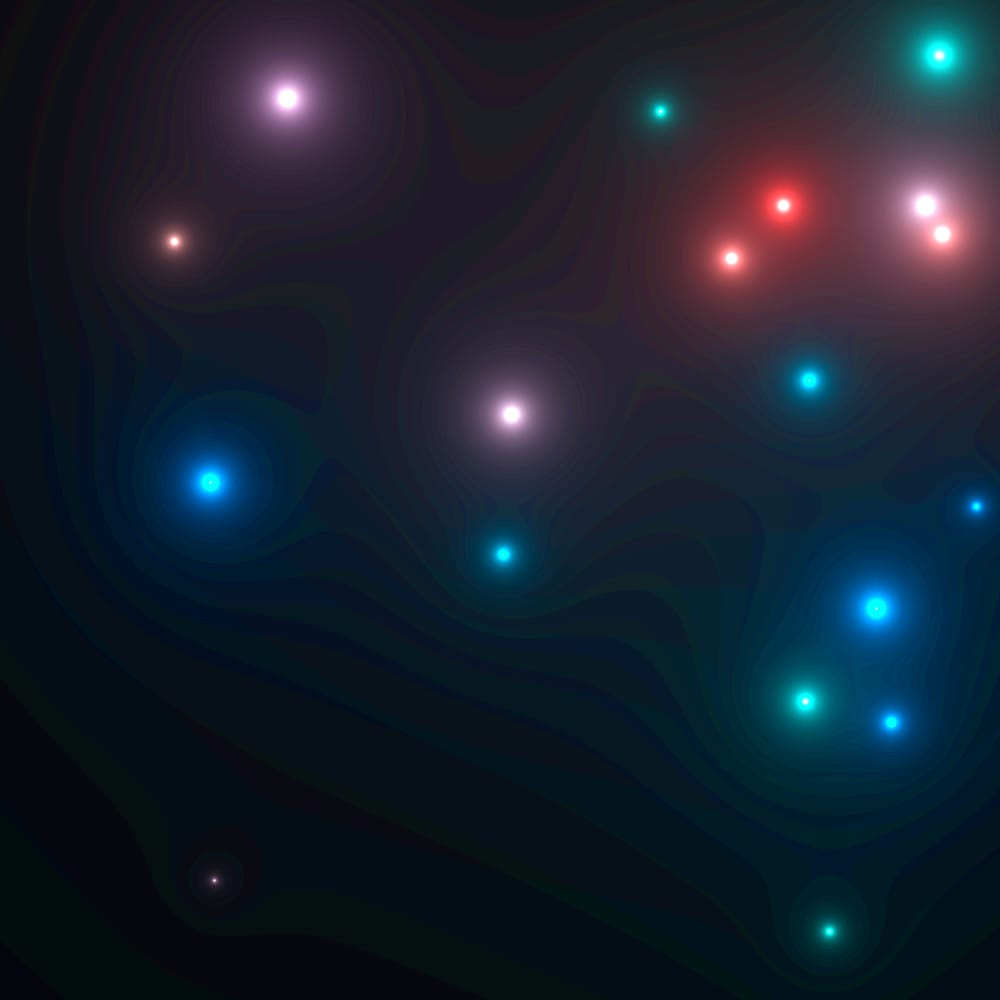
Metaballs visual created in Python

A simple generalization of metaballs is to apply the falloff curve to distance-from-lines or distance-from-surfaces.

There are a number of ways to render the metaballs to the screen. In the case of three dimensional metaballs, the two most common are brute-force raycasting and the marching cubes algorithm.

== See also ==
- NURBS
- Bézier surface
