= Institute of Technical Mechanics =

Technical Institution in Ukraine

Institute of Technical Mechanics (ITM NASU and SSAU)
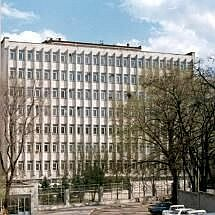
- ITM NASU and SSAU
- Other name: Институт технической механики НАН Украины и ГКА Украины
- Established: 1966
- Staff: 300
- Address: Ukraine, Dnipro, Leshko-Popel str., 15
- Location: Dnipro, Ukraine
- Website: http://www.itm.dp.ua

The Institute of Technical Mechanics of the National Academy of Sciences of Ukraine and the State Space Agency of Ukraine (ITM NASU and SSAU) is a research institution composed of the Mechanics division of National Academy of Sciences of Ukraine, the leading institute of the Ukrainian aerospace sector.

== History ==
The institute owed its establishment to Mikhail K. Yangel, one of the originators of rocket engineering in the USSR and Ukraine. M.K. Yangel was quite aware of the fact that the advancement of space engineering should be based on the latest achievements in basic and applied research in the field of engine engineering, heat-and-mass exchange and thermal protection, aero- and gas-dynamics, novel materials and technologies, strength and reliability, structural optimization, etc.
in April 1966 on Academician M.K. Yangel’s initiative, a new academic division was founded in Dnepropetrovsk: the Sector for Problems in Technical Mechanics, as a part of the Dnepropetrovsk Branch of the Institute of Mechanics of the Ukrainian Soviet Socialist Republic (Ukrainian SSR)’s Academy of Sciences.
The next stage in the institute’s history came in April 1968, when the Sector was reorganized into the Dnepropetrovsk Division of the Institute of Mechanics of the Ukrainian SSR’s Academy of Sciences. Vsevolod A. Lazaryan, Corresponding Member (from 1972 Academician) of the Ukrainian SSR’s Academy of Sciences, was appointed Head of Division. In June 1968, the physics and metallurgy departments of the former Branch of the B Verkin Institute for Low Temperature Physics and Engineering of the Ukrainian SSR’s Academy of Sciences were joined to the Division.
The scope of research at the Division grew from year to year, thus calling for the establishment of new departments. In February 1970, the research department of propulsion systems dynamics was established under the leadership of Viktor V. Pylypenko, D.Sc., with the task of augmenting the linear theory and devising a nonlinear theory of pogo self-oscillations of space vehicle structures, developing methods of dynamic characterization of liquid-propellant rocket engines and their components, and studying the dynamics of engine feed systems and transient regimes with consideration for cavitation in the centrifugal pumps with an inducer.
In 1973, the Sector for Problems in Space Engineering was structurally singled out at the Division. Until 1980, the sector was headed by Vasily S. Budnik, Academician of Ukrainian SSR’s Academy of Sciences.
In May 1980, the Division was transformed into the Institute of Technical Mechanics of the Ukrainian SSR’s Academy of Sciences. The institute was headed by Viktor V. Pylypenko, Corresponding Member of the Ukrainian SSR’s Academy of Sciences (now Academician of the National Academy of Sciences of Ukraine), D.Sc., Professor.
At the institute, a number of laboratories were organized and equipped with up-to-date testing facilities: laboratories of hydrodynamics, plasmadynamics, vacuum and aerodynamic engineering, dynamic testing, strength, high energy, and electroforming; a controlled flow gas-dynamics system; a system to study detonation solid-propellant rocket engines and gas generators; a high-pressure system for rocket nozzle testing, etc.
To further develop, coordinate, and improve organization of R&D’s in space engineering in Ukraine, the Presidium of the National Academy of Sciences of Ukraine and the National Space Agency of Ukraine issued in 1993 a joint decree-order, according to which the Institute of Technical Mechanics of the National Academy of Sciences of Ukraine was given the status of dual subordination and its lines of research were modified to solve scientific and technical problems involving the development and operation of current and prospective space hardware. In 1995, the institute became the leading institute of the Ukrainian space sector.
The institute provides scientific and technical support to the execution of the projects of the National Space Programs of Ukraine and coordinates R&D’s in space engineering under the supervision of the National Space Agency of Ukraine.

== Scientific directions of the Institute of Technical Mechanics ==
At present, fundamental and applied research are conducted at the institute.
Those involve:
the dynamics of mechanical and hydromechanical systems, of launch vehicle systems, and of rail and motor transport;
the aero-thermo and gas dynamics of power plants and flying and space vehicles and their subsystems;
the strength, reliability, and optimization of mechanical systems, launch vehicles, and spacecraft;
the mechanics of interaction of a solid with ionized media and electromagnetic radiation;
the systems analysis of trends and prospects in space engineering.
