= Kharkiv National University of Radio Electronics =

Public university in Kharkiv, Ukraine

Coordinates: 50°00′55″N 36°13′45″E

- Харківський національний університет радіоелектроніки
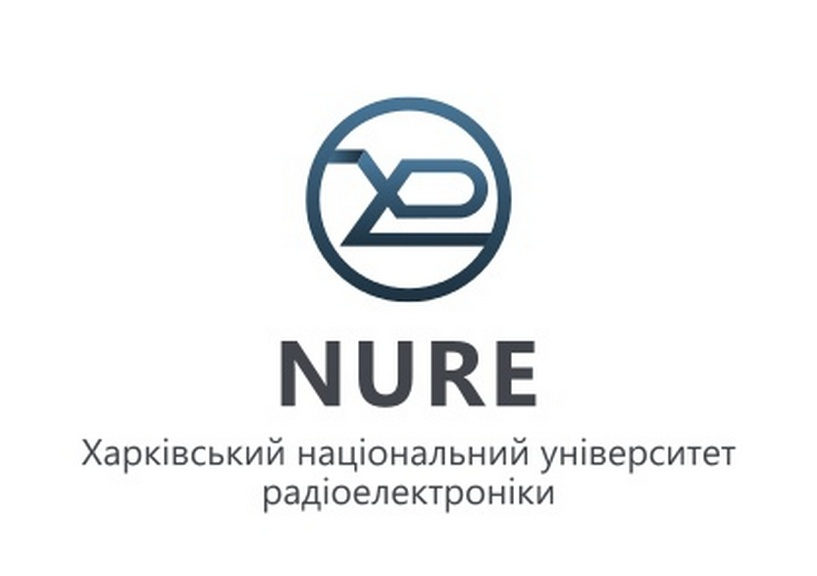
- Other name: NURE
- Former names: Kharkiv Engineering-Building Institute (1930–1966); Kharkiv Institute of Radio Electronics (1966–1993); Kharkiv Technical University of Radioelectronics (1993–2001)
- Established: 8/11/1930
- Affiliations: Ministry of Education and Science of Ukraine
- Rector: Igor Ruban
- Students: 7000+
- Location: пр-т Науки, 14 (14 Nauky Avenue), Kharkiv (м.Харків), Ukraine (Україна)
- Website: https://nure.ua/
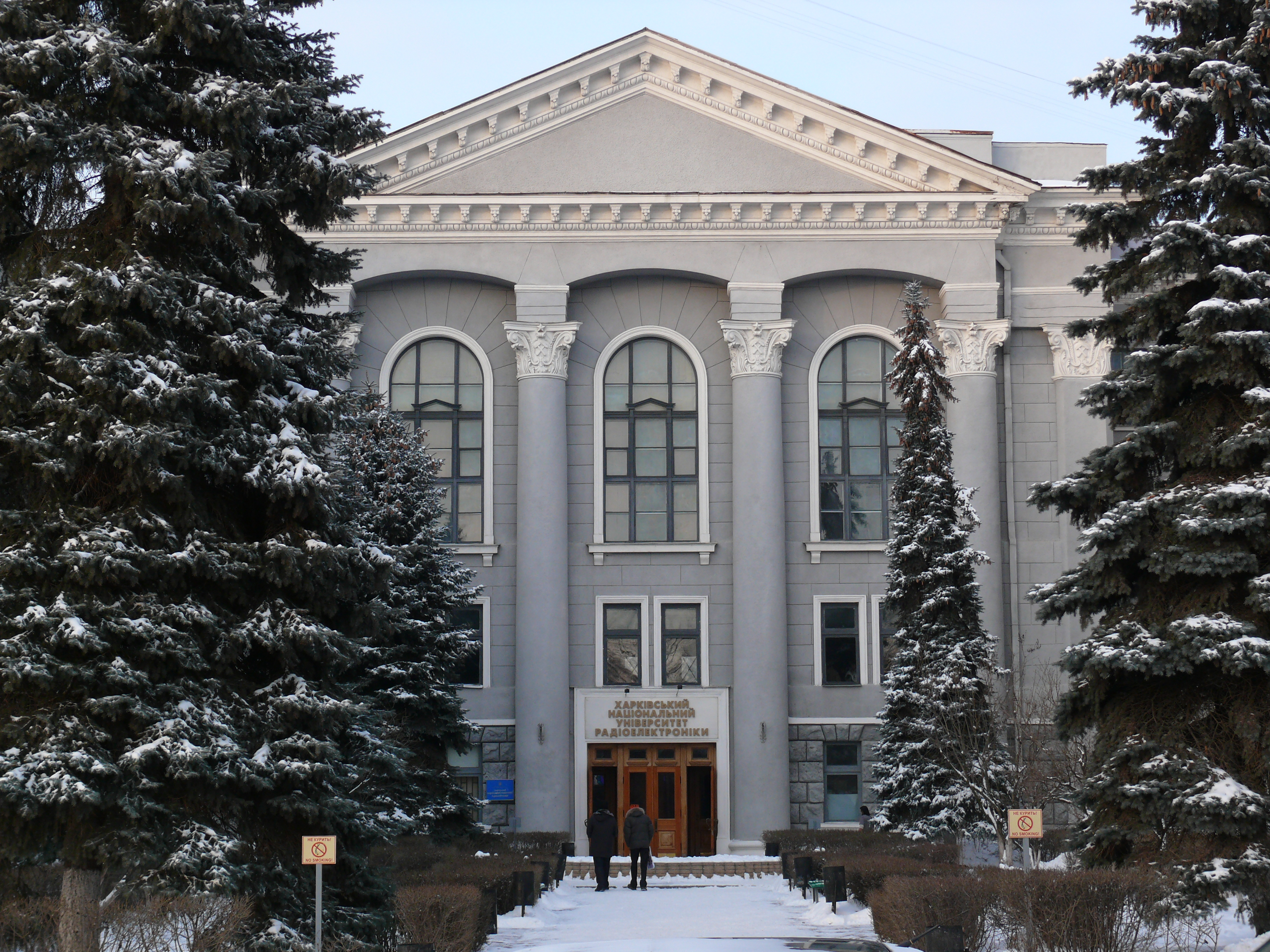

Immovable Monument of Local Significance of Ukraine
- Official name: «Інститут Радіоелектроніки» (Institute of Radioelectronics)
- Type: Urban Planning, Architecture
- Reference no.: 7261-Ха

University rankings

Regional – Overall
- QS Emerging Europe and Central Asia: 221-230 (2022)

The Kharkiv National University of Radio Electronics (abbr. NURE, Ukrainian: Харківський національний університет радіоелектроніки, НУРЕ, romanized: Kharkivskyi natsionalnyi universytet radioelektroniky) is a technological state-sponsored university based in Kharkiv, Ukraine. Founded in 1930, it is among the oldest technologically focused universities in Ukraine, with a student body of around 7,000.

NURE has 7 faculties and 34 departments, with a primary focus on electrical engineering, electronics, telecommunications, and computer technologies.

== Foundation and history ==
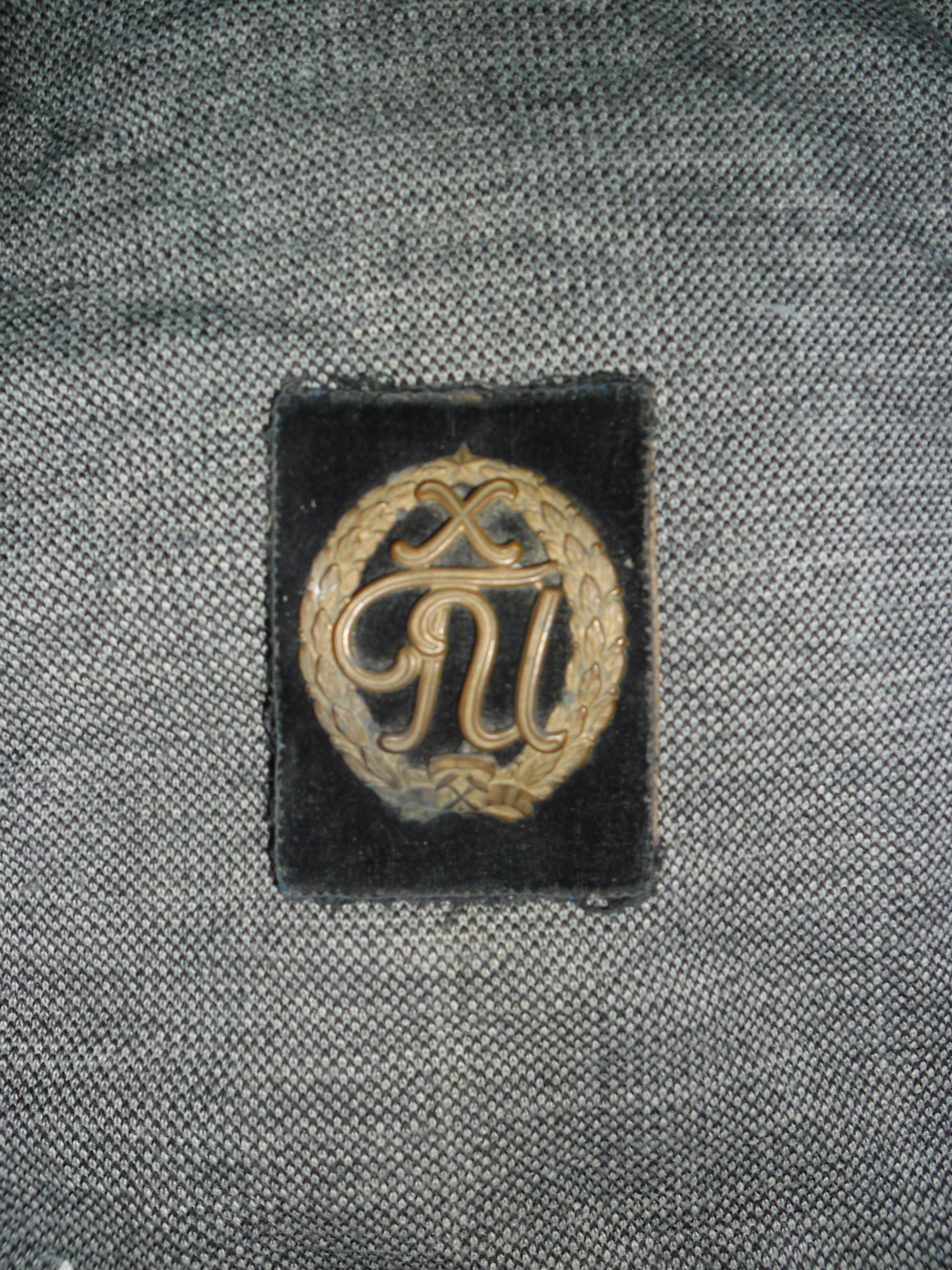
Emblem of the Kharkov Geodetic Institute

NURE was founded in 1930 as the Kharkiv Engineering-Building Institute (KEBI), initially combining faculty from the Kharkiv Polytechnical Institute and architectural faculty of Kharkiv Art Institute. In 1934 the Kharkiv Geodetic Institute and Scientific Research Institute of Geodesy and Cartography entered the structure of the institute, which later became the largest higher education institution in Ukraine with 1734 students, 200 teachers and 4 faculties. In 2001 the university was advanced to a National University.

== University structure ==
The university consists of 7 faculties and 34 departments:

- Faculty of Computer Sciences (CS)
- Faculty of Computer Engineering and Control (CEC)
- Faculty of Information and Analytical Technologies and Management (ITM)
- Faculty of Information Radio Technologies and Technical Information Security (IRTIS)
- Іnfocommunications (IC)
- Faculty of Automation and Computer Technologies (ACT)
- Faculty of Electronic and Biomedical Engineering (ELBE)

== Awards and reputation ==
The university ranks in QS World University Rankings, Times Higher Education World University Rankings, UniRank, EduRank, Uniranks.

== Scientific schools ==
A number of research laboratories operate on the basis of NURE. Scientific research is conducted in both fundamental and scientific-applied areas. There are 30 scientific schools:

- telecommunication systems;
- medical instrument making and medical microprocessor systems;
- design and diagnostics of computer systems and networks;
- design and technical diagnostics of digital systems on crystals, computers and networks;
- meteor radar;
- methodologies, methods and information technologies for the development of integrated and Web-based information systems;
- systems analysis, decision making and mathematical modeling in socio-economic systems;
- intellectual information processing;
- radio wave and infrared diagnostics of materials, environments and objects;
- applied electrodynamics;
- bionics of intelligence;
- noosphere methodology and technology for solving knowledge management and competitive intelligence problems;
- remote methods of sounding the atmosphere by acoustic and electromagnetic waves;
- methods of normalization, recognition, analysis and image processing in computer vision systems;
- thermal methods of non-destructive quality control of materials and products: defectoscopy, defectometry and tomography;
- hybrid computing intelligence systems for data analysis, information processing and control.

== Rectors ==
- Vikutan Abram Danilovich (1931–1933)
- Krol Semyon Lvovich (1933–1937)
- Blinov Vladimir Vasilyevich (1937–1941)
- Lukin Hryhoriy Hryhorovych (1944–1952)
- Korzhik Mikhail Vasilyevich (1952–1956)
- Emelyanov Dmitry Sidorovich (1956–1963)
- Tereshchenko Alexey Ivanovich (1963–1965)
- Rvachov Vladimir Logvinovich (1965–1966)
- Novikov Vsevolod Georgievich (1966–1983)
- Sviridov Valentin Viktorovich (1984–1994)
- Bondarenko Mikhail Fedorovich (1994–2013)
- Acting Rector Rubin Eduard Yukhimovich (2015–2016)
- Semenets Valerii Vasyliovych (2017–2022)
- Igor Ruban (since 2025)

== International partners ==
=== International partners ===
- Hochschule Düsseldorf, University of Applied Sciences, Germany
- University of Jyväskylä (JyU), Finland
- Linnaeus University, Sweden

== See also ==
List of universities in Ukraine
