= Isosurface =

Surface representing points of constant value within a volume

An isosurface is a three-dimensional analog of an isoline. It is a surface that represents points of a constant value (e.g. pressure, temperature, velocity, density) within a volume of space; in other words, it is a level set of a continuous function whose domain is 3-space.

The term isoline is also sometimes used for domains of more than 3 dimensions.

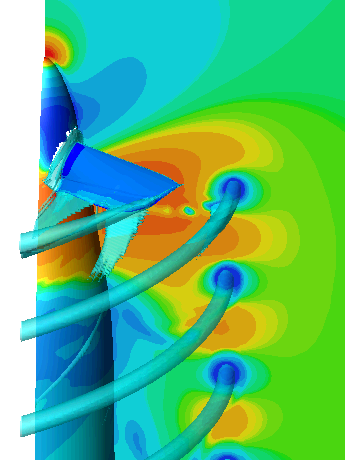
Isosurface of vorticity trailed from a propeller blade. Note that this is an isosurface plotted with a colormapped slice.

== Applications ==
Isosurfaces are normally displayed using computer graphics, and are used as data visualization methods in computational fluid dynamics (CFD), allowing engineers to study features of a fluid flow (gas or liquid) around objects, such as aircraft wings. An isosurface may represent an individual shock wave in supersonic flight, or several isosurfaces may be generated showing a sequence of pressure values in the air flowing around a wing. Isosurfaces tend to be a popular form of visualization for volume datasets since they can be rendered by a simple polygonal model, which can be drawn on the screen very quickly.

In medical imaging, isosurfaces may be used to represent regions of a particular density in a three-dimensional CT scan, allowing the visualization of internal organs, bones, or other structures.

Numerous other disciplines that are interested in three-dimensional data often use isosurfaces to obtain information about pharmacology, chemistry, geophysics and meteorology.

== Implementation algorithms ==
=== Marching cubes ===
The marching cubes algorithm was first published in the 1987 SIGGRAPH proceedings by Lorensen and Cline, and it creates a surface by intersecting the edges of a data volume grid with the volume contour. Where the surface intersects the edge the algorithm creates a vertex. By using a table of different triangles depending on different patterns of edge intersections the algorithm can create a surface. This algorithm has solutions for implementation both on the CPU and on the GPU.

=== Asymptotic decider ===
The asymptotic decider algorithm was developed as an extension to marching cubes in order to resolve the possibility of ambiguity in it.

=== Marching tetrahedra ===
The marching tetrahedra algorithm was developed as an extension to marching cubes in order to solve an ambiguity in that algorithm and to create higher quality output surface.

=== Surface nets ===
The Surface Nets algorithm places an intersecting vertex in the middle of a volume voxel instead of at the edges, leading to a smoother output surface.

=== Dual contouring ===
The dual contouring algorithm was first published in the 2002 SIGGRAPH proceedings by Ju and Losasso, developed as an extension to both surface nets and marching cubes. It retains a dual vertex within the voxel but no longer at the center. Dual contouring leverages the position and normal of where the surface crosses the edges of a voxel to interpolate the position of the dual vertex within the voxel. This has the benefit of retaining sharp or smooth surfaces where surface nets often look blocky or incorrectly beveled. Dual contouring often uses surface generation that leverages octrees as an optimization to adapt the number of triangles in output to the complexity of the surface.

=== Manifold dual contouring ===
Manifold dual contouring includes an analysis of the octree neighborhood to maintain continuity of the manifold surface

== Examples ==
Examples of isosurfaces are 'Metaballs' or 'blobby objects' used in 3D visualisation. A more general way to construct an isosurface is to use the function representation.

== Gallery ==
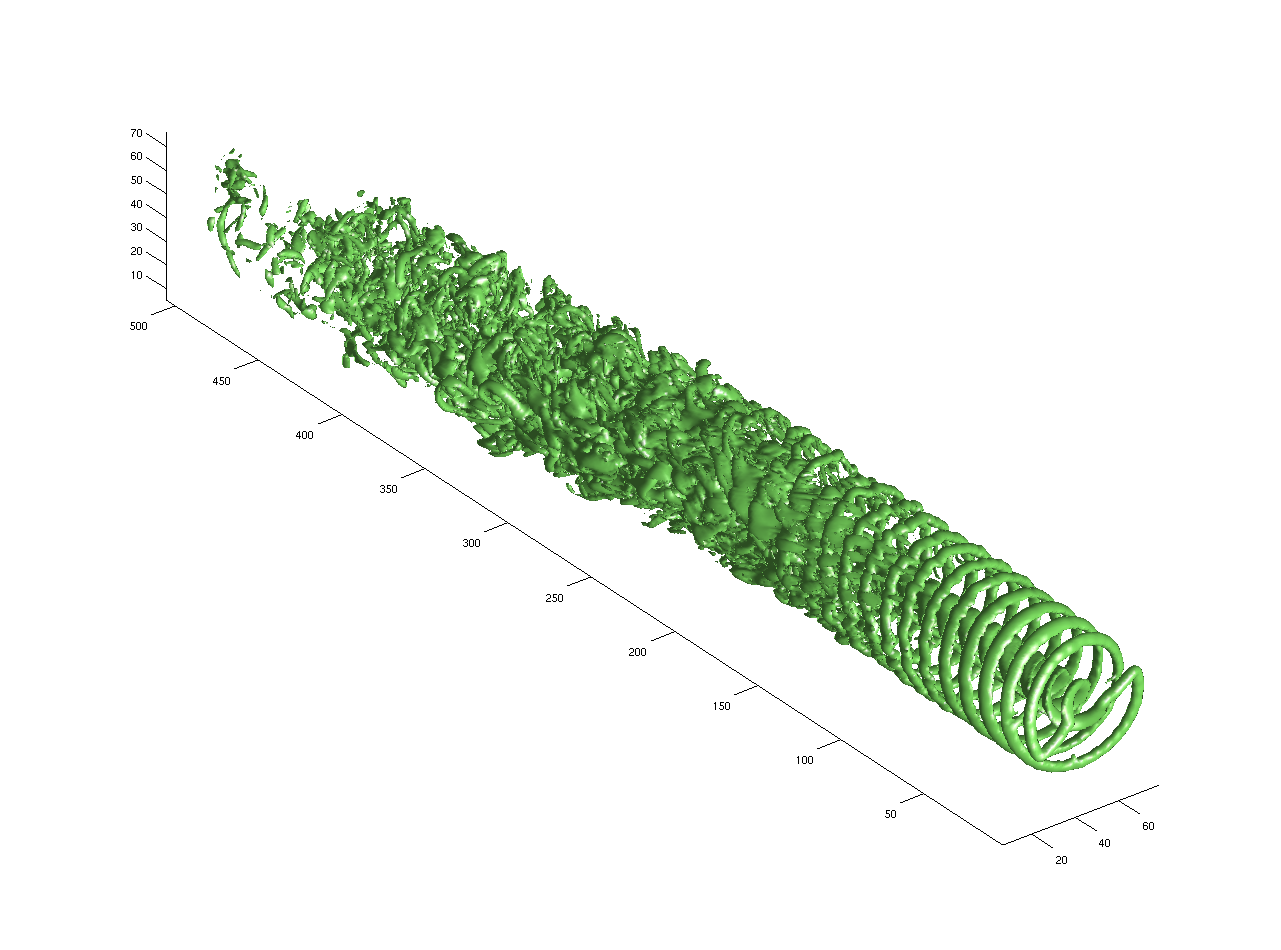
Surface of constant pressure.

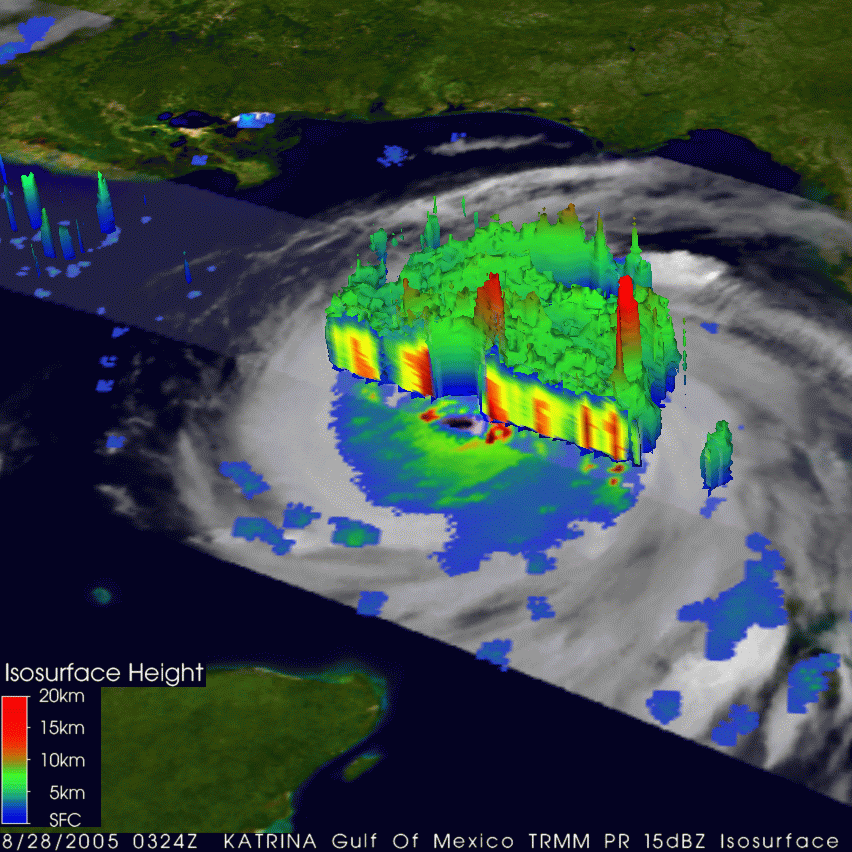
Surface with shading information varying across it to convey rain column height.

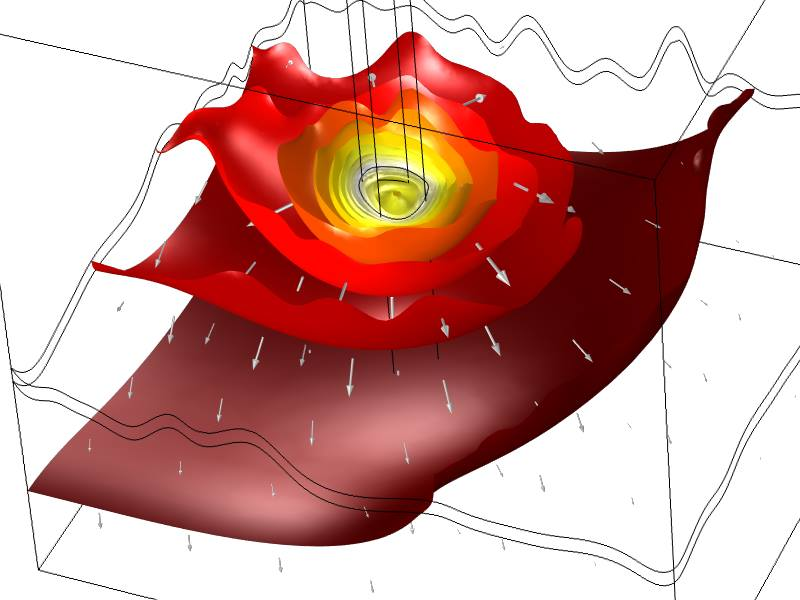
Multiple surfaces of constant temperature, with normal vectors added to each surface.

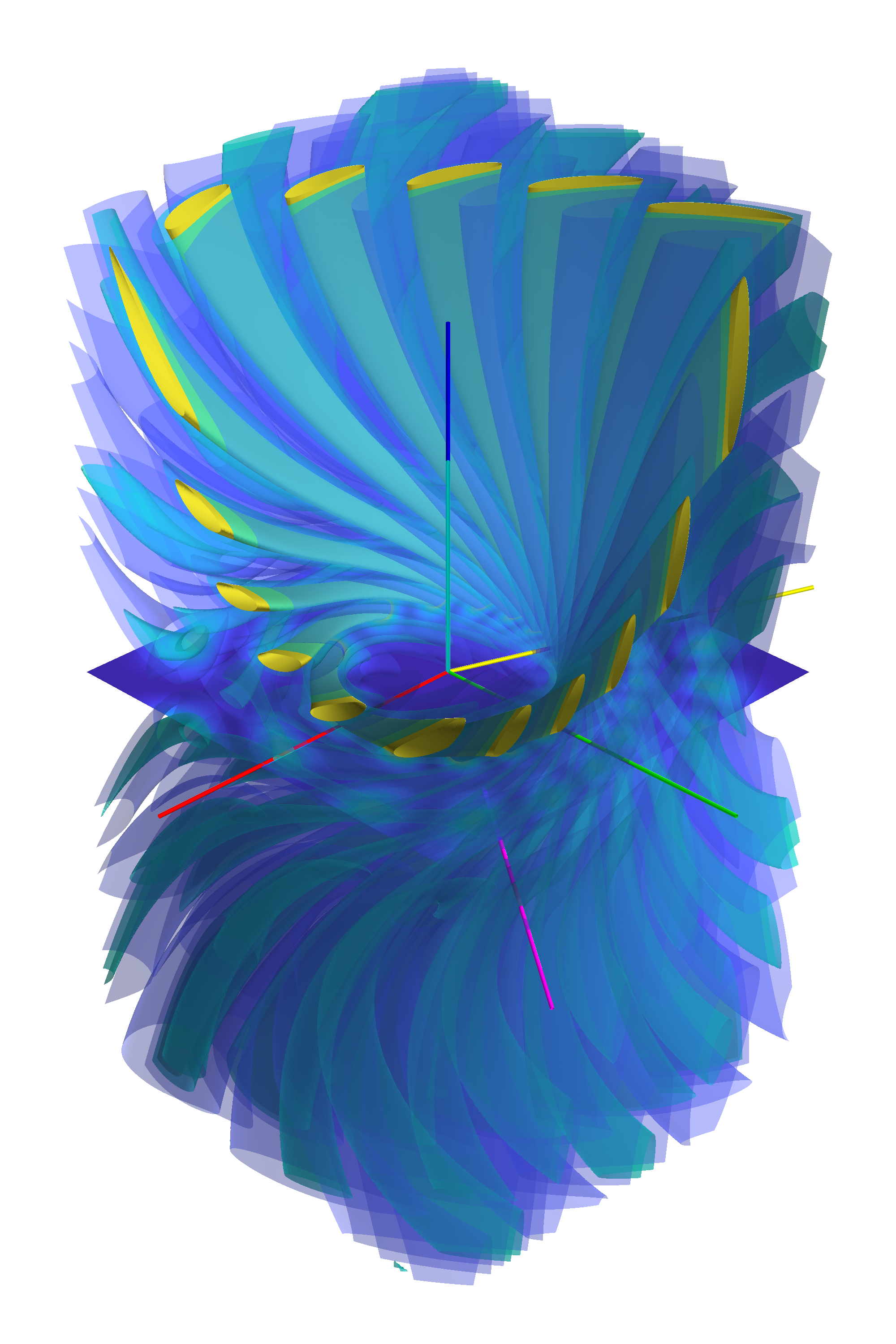
Surfaces of constant intensity, with color shading linked to intensity to permit conveying information about the contours of varying intensity fields.

== See also ==
- Isopotential
- Triangulation (geometry)
- Implicit surface
- Volume rendering
