= Image-based meshing =

Image-based meshing is the automated process of creating computer models for computational fluid dynamics (CFD) and finite element analysis (FEA) from 3D image data (such as magnetic resonance imaging (MRI), computed tomography (CT) or microtomography). Although a wide range of mesh generation techniques are currently available, these were usually developed to generate models from computer-aided design (CAD), and therefore have difficulties meshing from 3D imaging data.

== Mesh generation from 3D imaging data ==
Meshing from 3D imaging data presents a number of challenges but also unique opportunities for presenting a more realistic and accurate geometrical description of the computational domain. There are generally two ways of meshing from 3D imaging data:

=== CAD-based approach ===
The majority of approaches used to date still follow the traditional CAD route by using an intermediary step of surface reconstruction which is then followed by a traditional CAD-based meshing algorithm. CAD-based approaches use the scan data to define the surface of the domain and then create elements within this defined boundary. Although reasonably robust algorithms are now available, these techniques are often time consuming, and virtually intractable for the complex topologies typical of image data. They also do not easily allow for more than one domain to be meshed, as multiple surfaces are often non-conforming with gaps or overlaps at interfaces where one or more structures meet.

=== Image-based approach ===
This approach is the more direct way as it combines the geometric detection and mesh creation stages in one process which offers a more robust and accurate result than meshing from surface data. Voxel conversion technique providing meshes with brick elements and with tetrahedral elements have been proposed. Another approach generates 3D tetrahedral or tetrahedral elements throughout the volume of the domain, thus creating the mesh directly with conforming multipart surfaces.

== Generating a model ==
The steps involved in the generation of models based on 3D imaging data are:

=== Scan and image processing ===
An extensive range of image processing tools can be used to generate highly accurate models based on data from 3D imaging modalities, e.g. MRI, CT, MicroCT (XMT), and Ultrasound. Features of particular interest include:

- Segmentation tools (e.g. thresholding, floodfill, level set methods, etc.)
- Filters and smoothing tools (e.g. volume- and topology-preserving smoothing and noise reduction/artefact removing).

=== Volume and surface mesh generation ===
The image-based meshing technique allows the straightforward generation of meshes out of segmented 3D data. Features of particular interest include:

- Multi-part meshing (mesh any number of structures simultaneously)
- Mapping functions to apply material properties based on signal strength (e.g. Young's modulus to Hounsfield scale)
- Smoothing of meshes (e.g. topological preservation of data to ensure preservation of connectivity, and volume neutral smoothing to prevent shrinkage of convex hulls)
- Export to FEA and CFD codes for analysis (e.g. node sets, shell elements, material properties, contact surfaces, boundary layers, inlets/outlets)

== Typical use ==
- Biomechanics and design of medical and dental implants
- Food science
- Forensic science
- Materials science (composites and foams)
- Nondestructive testing (NDT)
- Paleontology and functional morphology
- Reverse engineering
- Soil science
- Petrophysics

== See also ==
- Image segmentation
