= Bagplot =

Multidimensional data visualization

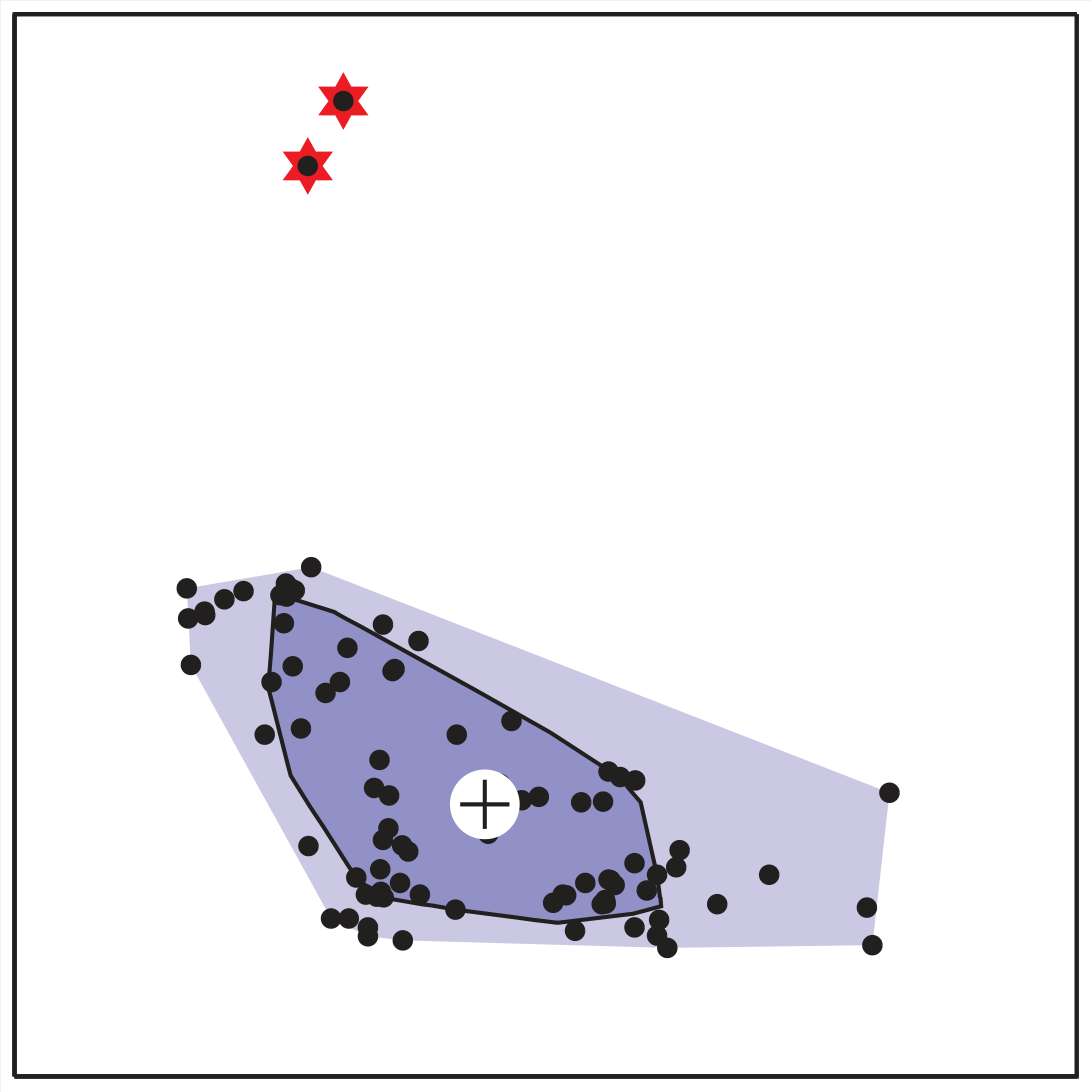
Example of a bagplot.

A bagplot is a method in robust statistics for visualizing two- or three-dimensional statistical data, analogous to the one-dimensional box plot. Introduced in 1999 by Rousseeuw et al., the bagplot allows one to visualize the location, spread, skewness, and outliers of a data set.

== Construction ==
The bagplot consists of three nested polygons, called the "bag", the "fence", and the "loop".

- The inner polygon, called the bag, is constructed on the basis of Tukey depth, the smallest number of observations that can be contained by a half-plane that also contains a given point. It contains 50% of the data points. Inside the bag is a cross or asterisk indicating the point with highest depth, called the depth median.
- The outermost of the three polygons, called the fence is not drawn as part of the bagplot, but is used to construct it. It is formed by inflating the bag around the depth median by a certain factor (usually 3). Observations outside the fence are flagged as outliers.
- The observations that are not marked as outliers are surrounded by a loop, the convex hull of the observations within the fence.

There is an option to connect the points between the bag and fence to the bag, on a line to the depth median.

The three-dimensional version of the bagplot draws the loop in transparent colors, so the bag remains visible.

== Properties ==
The bagplot is equivariant under affine transformations of the plane, and robust against outliers.
