= Dependent and independent variables =

Concept in mathematical modeling, statistical modeling and experimental sciences

A variable is considered dependent if it depends on (or is hypothesized to depend on) an independent variable. Dependent variables are the outcome of the test they depend on, by some law or rule (e.g., by a mathematical function). Independent variables, on the other hand, are not seen as depending on any other variable in the scope of the experiment in question. (Note: Even if the existing dependency is invertible (e.g., by finding the inverse function when it exists), the nomenclature is kept if the inverse dependency is not the object of study in the experiment.) Rather, they are controlled by the experimenter.

In single variable calculus, a function is typically graphed with the horizontal axis representing the independent variable and the vertical axis representing the dependent variable. In this function, y is the dependent variable and x is the independent variable.

== In pure mathematics ==
In mathematics, a function is a rule for taking an input (in the simplest case, a number or set of numbers) and providing an output (which may also be a number or set of numbers). A symbol that stands for an arbitrary input is called an independent variable, while a symbol that stands for an arbitrary output is called a dependent variable. The most common symbol for the input is x, and the most common symbol for the output is y; the function itself is commonly written y = f(x).

It is possible to have multiple independent variables or multiple dependent variables. For instance, in multivariable calculus, one often encounters functions of the form z = f(x,y), where z is a dependent variable and x and y are independent variables. Functions with multiple outputs are often referred to as vector-valued functions.

== In modeling and statistics ==
In mathematical modeling, the relationship between the set of dependent variables and set of independent variables is studied.

In the simple stochastic linear model y_{i} = a + bx_{i} + e_{i} the term y_{i} is the ith value of the dependent variable and x_{i} is the ith value of the independent variable. The term e_{i} is known as the "error" and contains the variability of the dependent variable not explained by the independent variable.

With multiple independent variables, the model is y_{i} = a + bx_{i,1} + bx_{i,2} + ... + bx_{i,n} + e_{i}, where n is the number of independent variables.

In statistics, more specifically in linear regression, a scatter plot of data is generated with X as the independent variable and Y as the dependent variable. This is also called a bivariate dataset, (x_{1}, y_{1})(x_{2}, y_{2}) ...(x_{i}, y_{i}). The simple linear regression model takes the form of Y_{i} = a + Bx_{i} + U_{i}, for i = 1, 2, ... , n. In this case, U_{i}, ... ,U_{n} are independent random variables. This occurs when the measurements do not influence each other. Through propagation of independence, the independence of U_{i} implies independence of Y_{i}, even though each Y_{i} has a different expectation value. Each U_{i} has an expectation value of 0 and a variance of σ^{2}. Proof of the expectation value of Y_{i}:

$$\operatorname{E}[Y_i] = \operatorname{E}[\alpha + \beta x_i + U_i] = \alpha + \beta x_i + \operatorname{E}[U_i] = \alpha + \beta x_i.$$

The line of best fit for the bivariate dataset takes the form y = α + βx and is called the regression line. α and β correspond to the intercept and slope, respectively.

In an experiment, the variable manipulated by an experimenter is something that is proven to work, called an independent variable. The dependent variable is the event expected to change when the independent variable is manipulated.

== Synonyms ==
Depending on the context, an independent variable is sometimes called a "predictor variable", "regressor", "covariate", "manipulated variable", "explanatory variable", "exposure variable" (see reliability theory), "risk factor" (see medical statistics), "feature" (in machine learning and pattern recognition) or "input variable". In econometrics, the term "control variable" is usually used instead of "covariate".

Depending on the context, a dependent variable is sometimes called a "response variable", "regressand", "criterion", "predicted variable", "measured variable", "explained variable", "experimental variable", "responding variable", "outcome variable", "output variable", "target" or "label". In economics endogenous variables are usually referencing the target.

=== Antonym pairs ===
Antonym pairs
independent	dependent
input	output
regressor	regressand
predictor	predicted
explanatory	explained
exogenous	endogenous
manipulated	measured
exposure	outcome
feature	label or target

"Explanatory variable" is preferred by some authors over "independent variable" when the quantities treated as independent variables may not be statistically independent or independently manipulable by the researcher. If the independent variable is referred to as an "explanatory variable" then the term "response variable" is preferred by some authors for the dependent variable.

"Explained variable" is preferred by some authors over "dependent variable" when the quantities treated as "dependent variables" may not be statistically dependent. If the dependent variable is referred to as an "explained variable" then the term "predictor variable" is preferred by some authors for the independent variable.

In data mining tools (for multivariate statistics and machine learning), the dependent variable is called target variable (or in some tools as label attribute), while an independent variable may be called a regular variable (or feature variable).

== Other variables ==
A variable may be thought to alter the dependent or independent variables, but may not actually be the focus of the experiment. So that the variable will be kept constant or monitored to try to minimize its effect on the experiment. Such variables may be designated as either a "controlled variable", "control variable", or "fixed variable".

Extraneous variables are candidate independent variables which may be included in a regression analysis to aid a researcher with accurate response parameter estimation, prediction, and goodness of fit, but are not of substantive interest to the hypothesis under examination. For example, in a study examining the effect of post-secondary education on lifetime earnings, some extraneous variables might be gender, ethnicity, social class, genetics, intelligence, age, and so forth. A variable is extraneous only when it can be assumed (or shown) to influence the dependent variable. If included in a regression, it can improve the fit of the model. If it is excluded from the regression and if it has a non-zero covariance with one or more of the independent variables of interest, its omission will bias the regression's result for the effect of that independent variable of interest. This effect is called confounding or omitted variable bias; in these situations, design changes and/or controlling for a variable are necessary. Extraneous variables are often classified into three types:

1. Subject variables, which are the characteristics of the individuals being studied that might affect their actions. These variables include age, gender, health status, mood, background, etc.
2. Blocking variables or experimental variables are characteristics of the persons conducting the experiment which might influence how a person behaves. Gender, the presence of racial discrimination, language, or other factors may qualify as such variables.
3. Situational variables are features of the environment in which the study or research was conducted, which have a bearing on the outcome of the experiment in a negative way. Included are the air temperature, level of activity, lighting, and time of day.

In modelling, variability that is not covered by the independent variable is designated by $e_I$ and is known as the "residual", "side effect", "error", "unexplained share", "residual variable", "disturbance", or "tolerance".

== Examples ==
- Effect of fertilizer on plant growths:
  In a study measuring the influence of different quantities of fertilizer on plant growth, the independent variable would be the amount of fertilizer used. The dependent variable would be the growth in height or mass of the plant. The controlled variables would be the type of plant, the type of fertilizer, the amount of sunlight the plant gets, the size of the pots, etc.
- Effect of drug dosage on symptom severity:
  In a study of how different doses of a drug affect the severity of symptoms, a researcher could compare the frequency and intensity of symptoms when different doses are administered. Here the independent variable is the dose and the dependent variable is the frequency/intensity of symptoms.
- Effect of temperature on pigmentation:
  In measuring the amount of color removed from beetroot samples at different temperatures, temperature is the independent variable and amount of pigment removed is the dependent variable.
- Effect of sugar added in a coffee:
  The taste varies with the amount of sugar added in the coffee. Here, the sugar is the independent variable, while the taste is the dependent variable.
- Sea level change:
  An example is provided by the analysis of trend in sea level by Woodworth (1987). Here the dependent variable (and variable of most interest) was the annual mean sea level at a given location for which a series of yearly values were available. The primary independent variable was time. Use was made of a covariate consisting of yearly values of annual mean atmospheric pressure at sea level. The results showed that inclusion of the covariate allowed improved estimates of the trend against time to be obtained, compared to analyses which omitted the covariate.

== See also ==
- Abscissa and ordinate
- Blocking (statistics)
- Latent and observable variables
- Mediation (statistics)
- Observed value
