= Tukey depth =

Computational geometry concept

In statistics and computational geometry, the Tukey depth or half-space depth is a measure of the depth of a point in a fixed set of points. The concept is named after its inventor, John Tukey. Given a set of n points $\mathcal{X}_n = \{X_1,\dots,X_n\}$ in d-dimensional space, Tukey's depth of a point x is the smallest fraction (or number) of points in any closed halfspace that contains x.

Tukey's depth measures how extreme a point is with respect to a point cloud. It is used to define the bagplot, a bivariate generalization of the boxplot.

For example, for any extreme point of the convex hull there is always a (closed) halfspace that contains only that point, and hence its Tukey depth as a fraction is 1/n.

== Definitions ==
Tukey's depth of a point x wrt to a point cloud. The blue region illustrates a halfspace containing x on the boundary. The halfspace is also a most extreme one so that it contains x but as few observations in the point cloud as possible. Thus, the proportion of points contained in this halfspace becomes the value of Tukey's depth for x.

Sample Tukey's depth of point x, or Tukey's depth of x with respect to the point cloud $\mathcal{X}_n$, is defined as

$D(x;\mathcal{X}_n) = \inf_{v\in\mathbb{R}^d, \|v \|=1} \frac{1}{n}\sum_{i=1}^n \mathbf{1}\{ v^T (X_i - x) \ge 0\},$

where $\mathbf{1}\{\cdot\}$ is the indicator function that equals 1 if its argument holds true or 0 otherwise.

Population Tukey's depth of x wrt to a distribution $P_X$ is

$D(x; P_X) = \inf_{v\in\mathbb{R}^d, \|v \|=1} P(v^T (X - x) \ge 0),$

where X is a random variable following distribution $P_X$.

== Tukey mean and relation to centerpoint ==
A centerpoint c of a point set of size n is nothing else but a point of Tukey depth of at least n/(d + 1).

== See also ==
- Centerpoint (geometry)
