= Vertex (geometry) =

Point where two or more curves, lines, or edges meet

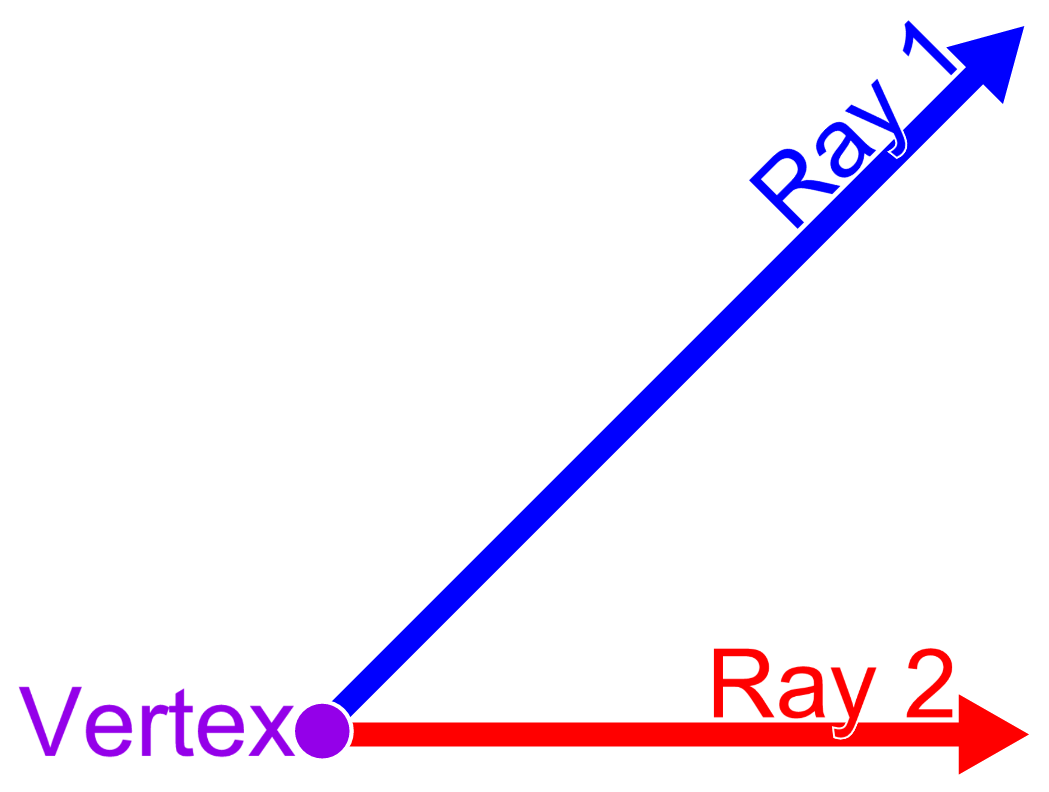
A vertex of an angle is the endpoint where two lines or rays come together.

In geometry, a vertex (pl.: vertices or vertexes), also called a corner, is a point where two or more curves, lines, or line segments meet or intersect. For example, the point where two lines meet to form an angle and the point where edges of polygons and polyhedra meet are vertices. The term vertex is also used for a different type of point in geometry, a vertex of a curve, meaning a point of extreme curvature.

== Definition ==
=== Of an angle ===
The vertex of an angle is the point where two rays begin or meet, where two line segments join or meet, where two lines intersect (cross), or any appropriate combination of rays, segments, and lines that result in two straight "sides" meeting at one place.

=== Of a polytope ===
A vertex (red) in a cube (black)

A vertex is a corner point of a polygon, polyhedron, or other higher-dimensional polytope, formed by the intersection of edges, faces or facets of the object.

In a polygon, a vertex is called "convex" if the internal angle of the polygon (i.e., the angle formed by the two edges at the vertex with the polygon inside the angle) is less than π radians (180°, two right angles); otherwise, it is called "concave" or "reflex". More generally, a vertex of a polyhedron or polytope is convex, if the intersection of the polyhedron or polytope with a sufficiently small sphere centered at the vertex is convex, and is concave otherwise.

Polytope vertices are related to vertices of graphs, in that the 1-skeleton of a polytope is a graph, the vertices of which correspond to the vertices of the polytope, and in that a graph can be viewed as a 1-dimensional simplicial complex the vertices of which are the graph's vertices.

However, in graph theory, vertices may have fewer than two incident edges, which is usually not allowed for geometric vertices. There is also a connection between geometric vertices and the vertices of a curve, its points of extreme curvature: in some sense the vertices of a polygon are points of infinite curvature, and if a polygon is approximated by a smooth curve, there will be a point of extreme curvature near each polygon vertex.

=== Of a simple polygon ===
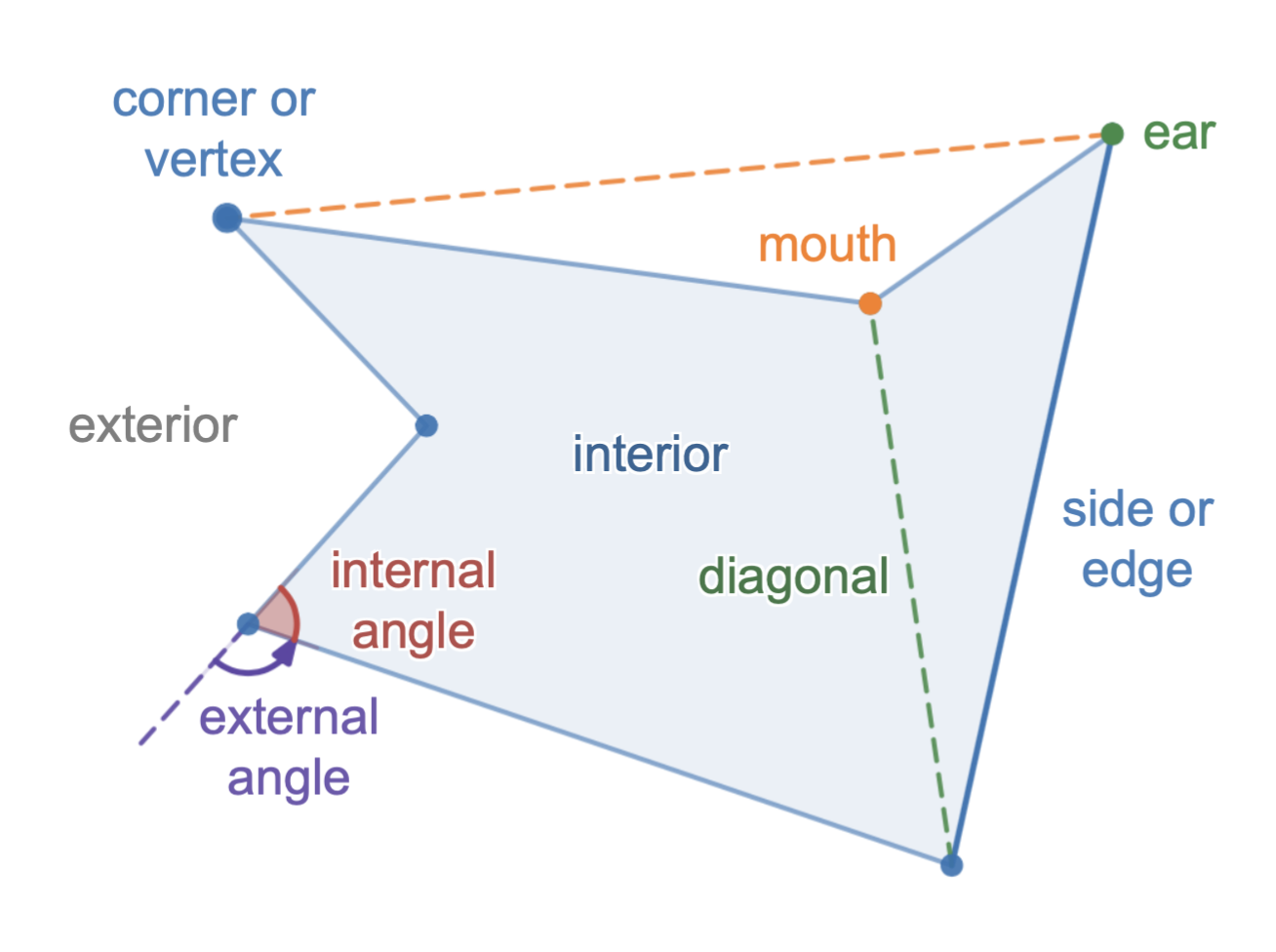
Parts of a simple polygon

A vertex x_{i} of a simple polygon P is a principal vertex if the diagonal [x_{(i − 1)}, x_{(i + 1)}] intersects the boundary of P only at x_{(i − 1)} and x_{(i + 1)}. There are two types of principal vertices: ears and mouths.

- A principal vertex x_{i} of a simple polygon P is called an ear if the diagonal [x_{(i − 1)}, x_{(i + 1)}] that bridges x_{i} lies entirely in P. (see also convex polygon) According to the two ears theorem, every simple polygon has at least two ears.
- A principal vertex x_{i} of a simple polygon P is called a mouth if the diagonal [x_{(i − 1)}, x_{(i + 1)}] lies outside the boundary of P.

=== Of a plane tiling ===
A vertex of a plane tiling or tessellation is a point where three or more tiles meet; generally, but not always, the tiles of a tessellation are polygons and the vertices of the tessellation are also vertices of its tiles. More generally, a tessellation can be viewed as a kind of topological cell complex, as can the faces of a polyhedron or polytope; the vertices of other kinds of complexes such as simplicial complexes are its zero-dimensional faces.

== Number of vertices of a polyhedron ==
Any convex polyhedron's surface has Euler characteristic
$$V - E + F = 2,$$
where V is the number of vertices, E is the number of edges, and F is the number of faces. This equation is known as Euler's polyhedron formula. Thus the number of vertices is 2 more than the excess of the number of edges over the number of faces. For example, since a cube has 12 edges and 6 faces, the formula implies that it has eight vertices.

== Vertices in computer graphics ==
In computer graphics, objects are often represented as triangulated polyhedra in which the object vertices are associated not only with three spatial coordinates but also with other graphical information necessary to render the object correctly, such as colors, reflectance properties, textures, and surface normal. These properties are used in rendering by a vertex shader, part of the vertex pipeline.

== See also ==
- Vertex arrangement
- Vertex figure
