= Bivariate data =

Statistical term of data on each of two paired variables

In statistics, bivariate data is data on each of two variables, where each value of one of the variables is paired with a value of the other variable. It is a specific but very common case of multivariate data. The association can be studied via a tabular or graphical display, or via sample statistics which might be used for inference. Typically it would be of interest to investigate the possible association between the two variables. The method used to investigate the association would depend on the level of measurement of the variable. This association that involves exactly two variables can be termed a bivariate correlation, or bivariate association.

For two quantitative variables (interval or ratio in level of measurement), a scatterplot can be used and a correlation coefficient or regression model can be used to quantify the association. For two qualitative variables (nominal or ordinal in level of measurement), a contingency table can be used to view the data, and a measure of association or a test of independence could be used.

If the variables are quantitative, the pairs of values of these two variables are often represented as individual points in a plane using a scatter plot. This is done so that the relationship (if any) between the variables is easily seen. For example, bivariate data on a scatter plot could be used to study the relationship between stride length and length of legs. In a bivariate correlation, outliers can be incredibly problematic when they involve both extreme scores on both variables. The best way to look for these outliers is to look at the scatterplots and see if any data points stand out between the variables.

== Dependent and independent variables ==
In some instances of bivariate data, it is determined that one variable influences or determines the second variable, and the terms dependent and independent variables are used to distinguish between the two types of variables. In the above example, the length of a person's legs is the independent variable. The stride length is determined by the length of a person's legs, so it is the dependent variable. Having long legs increases stride length, but increasing stride length will not increase the length of your legs.

Correlations between the two variables are determined as strong or weak correlations and are rated on a scale of –1 to 1, where 1 is a perfect direct correlation, –1 is a perfect inverse correlation, and 0 is no correlation. In the case of long legs and long strides, there would be a strong direct correlation.

== Analysis of bivariate data ==
In the analysis of bivariate data, one typically either compares summary statistics of each of the variables or uses regression analysis to find the strength and direction of a specific relationship between the variables. If each variable can only take one of a small number of values, such as only "male" or "female", or only "left-handed" or "right-handed", then the joint frequency distribution can be displayed in a contingency table, which can be analyzed for the strength of the relationship between the two variables.
