= Potato peeling =

In computational geometry, the potato peeling or convex skull problem is a problem of finding the convex polygon of the largest possible area that lies within a given non-convex simple polygon. It was posed independently by Goodman and Woo, and solved in polynomial time by Chang and Yap. The exponent of the polynomial time bound is high, but the same problem can also be accurately approximated in near-linear time.
