= David Eppstein =

American computer scientist and mathematician (born 1963)

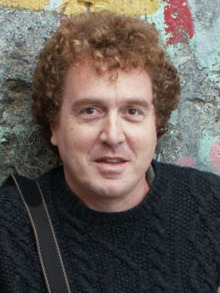
- Eppstein in September 2005 at Limerick, Ireland, during the 13th International Symposium on Graph Drawing
- Born: David Arthur Eppstein; 1963 (age 62–63); Windsor, England
- Citizenship: United States
- Education: Stanford University; Columbia University
- Scientific career
- Fields: Computational geometry; Graph algorithms
- Workplaces: University of California, Irvine
- Thesis: Efficient algorithms for sequence analysis with concave and convex gap costs (1989)
- Doctoral advisor: Zvi Galil
- Website: 11011110.github.io/blog

David Arthur Eppstein (born 1963) is an American computer scientist and mathematician. He is a distinguished professor of computer science at the University of California, Irvine, known for his work in computational geometry, graph algorithms, and recreational mathematics. Eppstein is also a Wikipedia editor and an administrator on the English Wikipedia.

== Education and career ==
Eppstein received a B.S. in mathematics from Stanford University in 1984, and later an M.S. (1985) and Ph.D. (1989) in computer science from Columbia University, after which he took a postdoctoral position at Xerox's Palo Alto Research Center. He joined the UC Irvine faculty in 1990, and was co-chair of the Computer Science Department there from 2002 to 2005. In 2014, he was named a Chancellor's Professor.

He obtained his Ph.D. in computer science in 1989, from Columbia University, advised by Zvi Galil. He has supervised thirteen PhD. students, all at University of California, Irvine.

Eppstein was named an ACM Fellow in 2011. In October 2017, he was one of 396 members elected as fellows of the American Association for the Advancement of Science.

Eppstein is an amateur digital photographer. He is also a Wikipedia editor and tries to bring more experts to the project.

Eppstein served as the program chair for the theory track of the ACM Symposium on Computational Geometry in 2001, the program chair of the ACM-SIAM Symposium on Discrete Algorithms in 2002, and the co-chair for the International Symposium on Graph Drawing in 2009.

== Research interests ==
In computer science, Eppstein's research has included work on minimum spanning trees, shortest paths, dynamic graph data structures, graph coloring, graph drawing and geometric optimization. He has published also in application areas such as finite element meshing, which is used in engineering design, and in computational statistics, particularly in robust, multivariate, nonparametric statistics.

== Selected publications ==
- Eppstein, David (1998). "Finding the k Shortest Paths" (PDF). SIAM Journal on Computing. 28 (2): 652–673. doi:10.1137/S0097539795290477.
  - Eppstein, David (1994). "Finding the k shortest paths" (PDF). Proceedings 35th Annual Symposium on Foundations of Computer Science. pp. 154–165. doi:10.1109/SFCS.1994.365697. ISBN 978-0-8186-6580-6. S2CID 3179241.
- Eppstein, D.; Galil, Z.; Italiano, G. F.; Nissenzweig, A. (1997). "Sparsification—a technique for speeding up dynamic graph algorithms". Journal of the ACM. 44 (5): 669–696. doi:10.1145/265910.265914.
- Amenta, N.; Bern, M.; Eppstein, D. (1998). "The Crust and the β-Skeleton: Combinatorial Curve Reconstruction" (PDF). Graphical Models and Image Processing. 60 (2): 125–135. Bibcode:1998GMIP...60..125A. doi:10.1006/gmip.1998.0465. S2CID 6301659. Archived from the original (PDF) on 2009-12-17.
- Bern, Marshall; Eppstein, David (1992). "Mesh generation and optimal triangulation" (PDF). Technical Report CSL-92-1. Xerox PARC: 1–78. Republished in Du, D.-Z.; Hwang, F. K., eds. (1995). "Mesh Generation and Optimal Triangulation". Computing in Euclidean Geometry. Lecture Notes Series on Computing. Vol. 4. World Scientific. pp. 47–123. doi:10.1142/9789812831699_0003. ISBN 978-981-02-1876-8.
- Eppstein, David; Lewis, Joel Brewster; Woodroofe, Russ (2025). "{Princ-wiki-a Mathematica}: Wikipedia Editing and Mathematics". Notices of the American Mathematical Society. 72 (1): 1. arXiv:2412.20419. doi:10.1090/noti3096. ISSN 0002-9920.
- Contributor in Algorithms and Computation, edited by Otfried Cheong. Springer-Verlag Berlin and Heidelberg GmbH & Co. KG, Berlin, 2010. ISBN 978-3-642-17516-9
- Contributing speaker in Algorithms -- ESA 2004 : 12th Annual European Symposium, Bergen, Norway, September 14-17, 2004, Proceedings. Susanne Albers, Ed. Springer, 2004. ISBN 978-3-540-23025-0
- Eppstein, D., Italiano, G. F., Tamassia, R., Tarjan, R. E., Westbrook, J., & Yung, M. (1990). "Maintenance of a minimum spanning forest in a dynamic planar graph." In Proceedings of the 1st Annual ACM-SIAM Symposium on Discrete Algorithms, SODA 1990 (pp. 1-11). (Proceedings of the Annual ACM-SIAM Symposium on Discrete Algorithms). Association for Computing Machinery.

=== Books ===
==== Books as editor ====
- Knowledge Spaces: Applications in Education, by Jean-Claude Falmagne, Dietrich Albert, David Eppstein, et al., Jul 3, 2013. Springer. ISBN 978-3-6423-5329-1.
- Graph Drawing: 17th International Symposium, GD 2009, Chicago, IL, USA, September 22-25, 2009. (Lecture Notes in Computer Science, 5849) 2010th Edition, by David Eppstein (Editor), Emden R Gansner (Editor). Springer. ISBN 978-3-642-11804-3.

==== Books as author ====
- Eppstein, D.; Falmagne, J.-Cl.; Ovchinnikov, S. (2008). Media Theory: Interdisciplinary Applied Mathematics. Springer-Verlag. doi:10.1007/978-3-540-71697-6. ISBN 978-3-642-09083-7.
- Eppstein, D. (2018). Forbidden Configurations in Discrete Geometry. Cambridge University Press. doi:10.1017/9781108539180. ISBN 978-1-108-43913-8.

== See also ==
- Eppstein's algorithm
- List of Wikipedia people
- Nauru graph
