= Giuseppe F. Italiano =

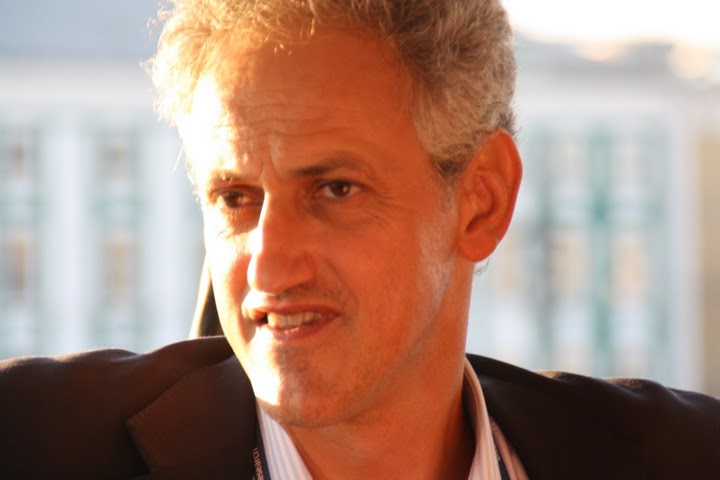
- Born: 16 March 1961 (age 65); Milazzo, Italy
- Education: Columbia University
- Known for: graph algorithms data structures algorithm engineering
- Awards: EATCS Fellow (2016)
- Scientific career
- Fields: Computer Science
- Workplaces: LUISS University
- Doctoral advisor: Zvi Galil

Giuseppe Francesco (Pino) Italiano (born 16 March 1961) is an Italian computer scientist. He is a professor of computer science at LUISS University in Rome. He is known for his work in graph algorithms, data structures and algorithm engineering.

== Education and career ==
He received his laurea summa cum laude in electrical engineering from Sapienza University of Rome in 1986, and a PhD in computer science from Columbia University in 1991.

He was research staff member (1991-1996) at the IBM Thomas J. Watson Research Center and a full professor of computer science at the University of Salerno (1994-1995), at the Ca' Foscari University of Venice (1995-1998), and at the University of Rome Tor Vergata (1998-2018), where he was department chair from 2004 to 2012. Since 2018 he is professor of computer science at LUISS University.

From 2008 to 2014, Italiano was editor-in-chief of the ACM Journal of Experimental Algorithmics.

== Awards and honors ==
In 2016 Italiano was named an EATCS Fellow for his "fundamental contributions to the design and analysis of algorithms for solving theoretical and applied problems in graphs and massive data sets, and for his role in establishing the field of algorithm engineering".

== Selected publications ==
- Eppstein, David; Galil, Zvi; Giancarlo, Raffaele; Italiano, Giuseppe F. (1992), "Sparse dynamic programming. I. Linear cost functions", Journal of the ACM, 39 (3): 519–545, doi:10.1145/146637.146650, MR 1177953, S2CID 17060840.
- Eppstein, David; Galil, Zvi; Italiano, Giuseppe F.; Nissenzweig, Amnon (1997), "Sparsification—a technique for speeding up dynamic graph algorithms", Journal of the ACM, 44 (5): 669–696, doi:10.1145/265910.265914, MR 1492341, S2CID 340999.
- Li, Bo; Golin, M.J.; Italiano, G.F.; Deng, Xin; Sohraby, K. (1999), "On the optimal placement of web proxies in the Internet", Proceedings of the Eighteenth Annual Joint Conference of the IEEE Computer and Communications Societies (INFOCOM '99), vol. 3, pp. 1282–1290, doi:10.1109/infcom.1999.752146, ISBN 0-7803-5417-6, S2CID 29096315.
- Demetrescu, Camil; Italiano, Giuseppe F. (2004), "A new approach to dynamic all pairs shortest paths", Journal of the ACM, 51 (6): 968–992, doi:10.1145/1039488.1039492, MR 2145260, S2CID 14104338.
- Demetrescu, Camil; Italiano, Giuseppe F. (2005), "Trade-offs for fully dynamic transitive closure on DAGs: breaking through the O(n^{2}) barrier" (PDF), Journal of the ACM, 52 (2): 147–156, doi:10.1145/1059513.1059514, MR 2147990, S2CID 17007009.
