= Zvi Galil =

Israeli mathematician and computer scientist

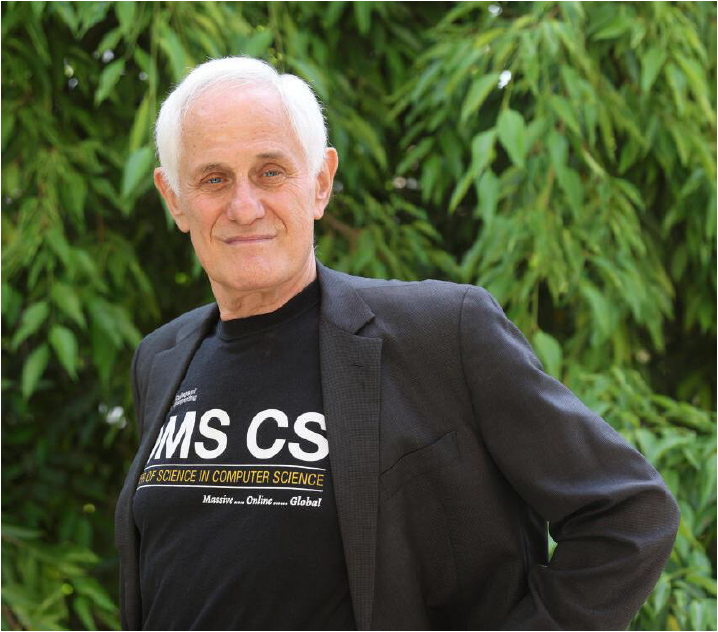
- Galil in 2023
- Born: June 26, 1947 (age 79); Tel Aviv, Mandatory Palestine
- Education: Tel Aviv University (BSc, MSc); Cornell University (PhD)
- Awards: ACM Fellow; NAE Member; American Academy of Arts and Sciences Fellow
- Scientific career
- Fields: Computer science; Mathematics
- Workplaces: IBM; Tel Aviv University; Columbia University; Georgia Institute of Technology
- Doctoral advisor: John Hopcroft
- Doctoral students: Mordechai Ben-Ari; Moti Yung; David Eppstein; Giuseppe F. Italiano; Matthew K. Franklin; Jonathan Katz; Stuart Haber

Zvi Galil (Hebrew: צבי גליל; born June 26, 1947) is an Israeli-American computer scientist. He has served as the dean of the Columbia University School of Engineering and as president of Tel Aviv University from 2007 through 2009. From 2010 to 2019, he was the dean of the Georgia Institute of Technology College of Computing.

His research interests include the design and analysis of algorithms, computational complexity and cryptography. He has been credited with coining the terms stringology and sparsification.

== Early life and education ==
Galil was born in Tel Aviv in Mandatory Palestine in 1947. He completed both his B.Sc. (1970) and his M.Sc. (1971) in applied mathematics, both summa cum laude, at Tel Aviv University. In 1975, he earned his Ph.D. in computer science at Cornell University under the supervision of John Hopcroft. He then spent a year working as a post-doctorate researcher at IBM's Thomas J. Watson Research Center in Yorktown Heights, New York.

== Career ==
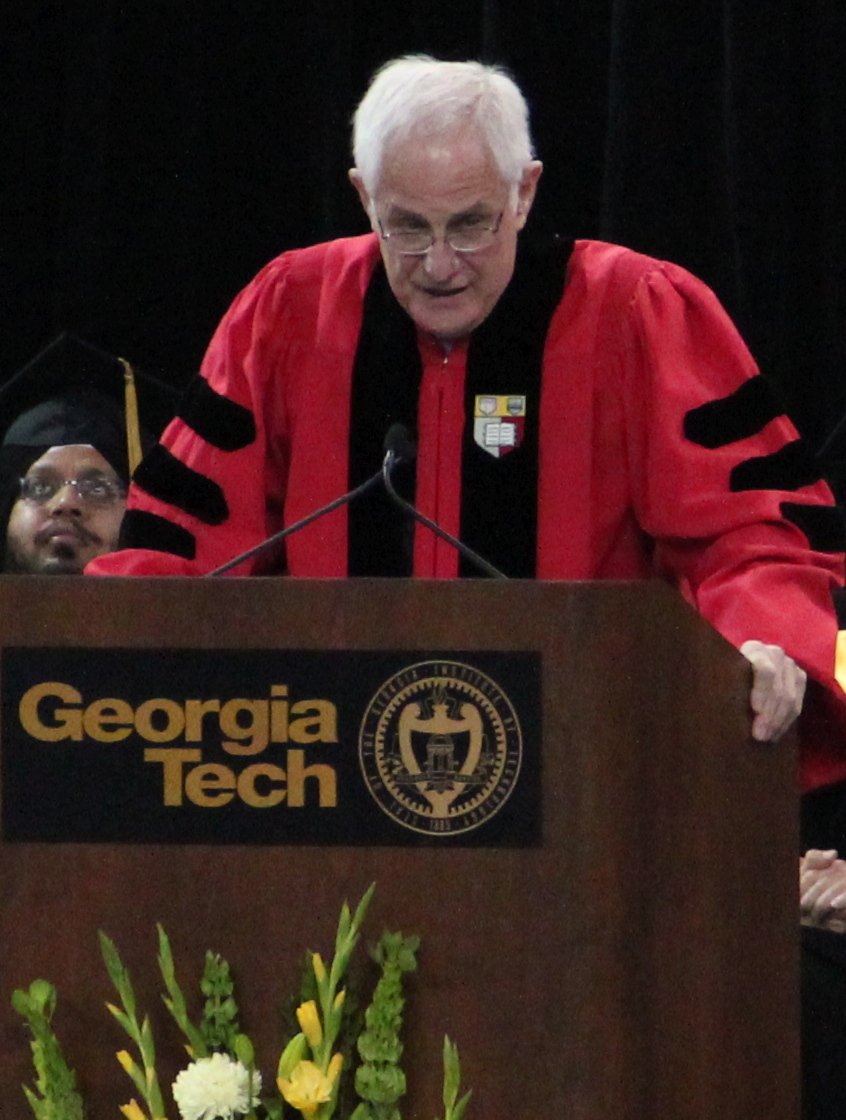
Galil at Georgia Tech in December 2016

From 1976 until 1995, he worked in the computer science department at Tel Aviv University, serving as its chair from 1979 to 1982. In 1982, he joined the faculty of Columbia University, serving as the chair of the computer science department from 1989 to 1994. From 1995-2007, he served as the dean of the Columbia University Fu Foundation School of Engineering & Applied Science. In this position, he oversaw the naming of the school in honor of Chinese businessman Z. Y. Fu after a large donation was given in his name. At Columbia, he was appointed the Julian Clarence Levi Professor of Mathematical Methods and Computer Science in 1987, and the Morris and Alma A. Schapiro Dean of Engineering in 1995.

In 2007, Galil succeeded Itamar Rabinovich as president of Tel Aviv University. In 2009, he resigned and returned to the faculty, and was succeeded by Joseph Klafter. He was named as the dean of Georgia Tech's college of computing on April 9, 2010. At Georgia Tech, together with Udacity founder Sebastian Thrun, Galil conceived of the college of computing's online Master of Science in computer science (OMSCS) program, and he led the faculty creation of the program. OMSCS went on to become the largest online master’s program in computer science in the United States. OMSCS has been featured in hundreds of articles, including a 2013 front-page article in The New York Times and 2021 interviews in The Wall Street Journal and Forbes. Inside Higher Education noted that OMSCS "suggests that institutions can successfully deliver high-quality, low-cost degrees to students at scale". The Chronicle of Higher Education noted that OMSCS "may have the best chance of changing how much students pay for a traditional degree". A 2023 Forbes article, titled "The Greatest Degree Program Ever", stated that OMSCS "is - by nearly any measure - the most successful degree program in history". Galil stepped down as dean and returned to a regular faculty position in June 2019. He now serves as the Frederick G. Storey Chair in Computing and Executive Advisor to Online Programs at Georgia Tech.

=== Professional service ===
In 1982, Galil founded the Columbia University Theory Day and organized the event for the first 15 years. It still exists as the New York Area Theory Day. From 1983 to 1987, Galil served as the chairman of ACM SIGACT, an organization that promotes research in theoretical computer science. He served as managing editor of SIAM Journal on Computing from 1991 to 1997 and editor in chief of Journal of Algorithms from 1988 to 2003.

=== Research ===
Galil's research is in the areas of algorithms, particularly string and graph algorithms, complexity, and cryptography. He has also conducted research in experimental design with Jack Kiefer.

Galil's real-time algorithms are the fastest possible for string matching and palindrome recognition, and they work even on the most basic computer model, the multi-tape Turing machine. More generally, he formulated a "predictability" condition that allows any complying online algorithm to be converted to a real-time algorithm. With Joel Seiferas, Galil improved the time-optimal algorithms to be space optimal (logarithmic space) as well.

Galil worked with Dany Breslauer to design a linear-work, O(loglogn) parallel algorithm for string matching, and they later proved it to have the best possible time complexity among linear work algorithms. With other computer scientists, he designed a constant-time linear-work randomized search algorithm to be used when the pattern preprocessing is given.

With his students, Galil designed more than a dozen currently-fastest algorithms for exact or approximate, sequential or parallel, and one- or multi-dimensional string matching.

Galil worked with other computer scientists to develop several currently-fastest graph algorithms. Examples include trivalent graph isomorphism and minimum weight spanning trees.

With his students, Galil devised a technique he called "sparsification" and a method he called "sparse dynamic programming". The first was used to speed up dynamic graph algorithms. The second was used to speed up the computations of various edit distances between strings.

In 1979, together with Ofer Gabber, Galil solved the previously open problem of constructing a family of expander graphs with an explicit expansion ratio, useful in the design of fast graph algorithms.

== Awards and honors ==
In 1995, Galil was inducted as a fellow at the Association for Computing Machinery for "fundamental contributions to the design and analysis of algorithms and outstanding service to the theoretical computer science community," and in 2004, he was elected to the National Academy of Engineering for "contributions to the design and analysis of algorithms and for leadership in computer science and engineering."

In 2005, he was selected as a Fellow of the American Academy of Arts and Sciences.

In 2008, Columbia University established the Zvi Galil award for student life. In 2009, the Columbia Society of Graduates awarded him the Great Teacher Award.

In 2012, The University of Waterloo awarded Galil with an honorary Doctor of Mathematics degree for his "fundamental contributions in the areas of graph algorithms and string matching." In 2020, Academic Influence included Galil in the list of the 10 most influential computer scientists of the last decade, and the advisory board of the College of Computing at Georgia Tech raised over $2 million from over 130 donors to establish an endowed chair named after Galil. In 2024, Columbia University awarded Galil an honorary doctorate, and in 2025 the Columbia Engineering Alumni Association awarded him the Michael Pupin Medal for service to the nation in science, technology, or engineering.
