= Subhash Suri =

Indian-American computer scientist

Subhash Suri (born July 7, 1960) is an Indian-American computer scientist, a professor at the University of California, Santa Barbara. He is known for his research in computational geometry, computer networks, and algorithmic game theory.

== Education ==
Suri did his undergraduate studies at the Indian Institute of Technology Roorkee, graduating in 1981. He then worked as a programmer in India before beginning his graduate studies in 1984 at Johns Hopkins University, where he earned a Ph.D. in computer science in 1987 under the supervision of Joseph O'Rourke.

== Career ==
He was a member of the technical staff at Bellcore until 1994, when he returned to academia as an associate professor at Washington University in St. Louis. He moved to a full professorship at UCSB in 2000.

He was program committee chair for the 7th Annual International Symposium on Algorithms and Computation in 1996, and program committee co-chair for the 18th ACM Symposium on Computational Geometry in 2002.

== Awards and honors ==
Suri was elected as a fellow of the IEEE in 2009, of the Association for Computing Machinery in 2010, and of the American Association for the Advancement of Science in 2011.

== Selected publications ==
- Srinivasan, V.; Suri, S.; Varghese, G. (1999), "Packet classification using tuple space search", Proceedings of the ACM SIGCOMM '99 Conference on Applications, Technologies, Architectures, and Protocols for Computer Communication, pp. 135–146, doi:10.1145/316188.316216, ISBN 978-1581131352, S2CID 207574370
- Hershberger, John; Suri, Subhash (1999), "An optimal algorithm for Euclidean shortest paths in the plane", SIAM Journal on Computing, 28 (6): 2215–2256, doi:10.1137/S0097539795289604, MR 1698954.
- Buragohain, Chiranjeeb; Agrawal, Divyakant; Suri, Subhash (2003), "A game theoretic framework for incentives in P2P systems", Proceedings of the 3rd International Conference on Peer-to-Peer Computing (P2P 2003), pp. 48–56, arXiv:cs/0310039, doi:10.1109/PTP.2003.1231503, ISBN 978-0-7695-2023-0, S2CID 5110036.
- Jardosh, Amit; Belding-Royer, Elizabeth M.; Almeroth, Kevin C.; Suri, Subhash (2003), "Towards realistic mobility models for mobile ad hoc networks", Proceedings of the 9th International Conference on Mobile Computing and Networking (MobiCom '03), pp. 217–229, doi:10.1145/938985.939008, ISBN 978-1581137538, S2CID 747860.
- Shrivastava, Nisheeth; Buragohain, Chiranjeeb; Agrawal, Divyakant; Suri, Subhash (2004), "Medians and beyond: new aggregation techniques for sensor networks", Proceedings of the 2nd International Conference on Embedded Networked Sensor Systems (SenSys '04), pp. 239–249, doi:10.1145/1031495.1031524, ISBN 978-1581138795, S2CID 47110300.
- Hershberger, John; Maxel, Matthew; Suri, Subhash (2007). "Finding the k Shortest Simple Paths: A New Algorithm and its Implementation" (PDF). ACM Transactions on Algorithms. 3 (4). Article 45 (19 pages). doi:10.1145/1290672.1290682. S2CID 10703503.
