= Distance between two parallel lines =

Problem in coordinate geometry

The distance between two parallel lines in the plane is the minimum distance between any two points.

== Formula and proof ==
Because the lines are parallel, the perpendicular distance between them is a constant, so it does not matter which point is chosen to measure the distance. Given the equations of two non-vertical parallel lines

$$y = mx+b_1\,$$
$$y = mx+b_2\,,$$

the distance between the two lines is the distance between the two intersection points of these lines with the perpendicular line

$$y = -x/m \, .$$

This distance can be found by first solving the system of linear equations

$$\begin{cases}
y = mx+b_1 \\
y = -x/m \, ,
\end{cases}$$

and

$$\begin{cases}
y = mx+b_2 \\
y = -x/m \, ,
\end{cases}$$

to get the coordinates of the intersection points. The solutions to the linear systems are the points

$$\left( x_1,y_1 \right)\ = \left( \frac{-b_1m}{m^2+1},\frac{b_1}{m^2+1} \right)\, ,$$

and

$$\left( x_2,y_2 \right)\ = \left( \frac{-b_2m}{m^2+1},\frac{b_2}{m^2+1} \right)\, .$$

The distance between the points is

$$d = \sqrt{\left(\frac{b_1m-b_2m}{m^2+1}\right)^2 + \left(\frac{b_2-b_1}{m^2+1}\right)^2}\,,$$

which reduces to

$$d = \frac{|b_2-b_1|}{\sqrt{m^2+1}}\,.$$

When the lines are given by

$$ax+by+c_1=0\,$$
$$ax+by+c_2=0,\,$$

the distance between them can be expressed as

$$d = \frac{|c_2-c_1|}{\sqrt {a^2+b^2}}.$$

More generally, when the coefficients of $x$ and $y$ are different, i.e. the parallel lines are given by the $a_1 x + b_1 y + c_1 = 0$ and the $a_2 x + b_2 y + c_2 = 0$ equations where $(a_1, b_1)\ ||\ (a_2, b_2)$, the distance can be expressed as

$d = \frac{\sqrt{(a_1 c_2 - a_2 c_1)^2 + (b_1 c_2 - b_2 c_1)^2}}{|a_1 b_1 + a_2 b_2|}$

== See also ==
- Distance from a point to a line
