= Kinetic sorted list =

Kinetic data structure

A kinetic sorted list is a kinetic data structure for maintaining a list of points under motion in sorted order. It is used as a kinetic predecessor data structure, and as a component in more complex kinetic data structures such as kinetic closest pair.

== Implementation ==
This data structure maintains a list of the elements in sorted order, with the certificates enforcing the order between adjacent elements. When a certificate fails, the concerned elements are swapped. Then at most three certificates must be updated, the certificate of the swapped pair, and the two certificates involving the swapped elements and the elements of the sorted list which directly precede and follow the swapped pair.

For example, given a sorted list {A,B,C,D,E,F}, the certificates will be [A<B], [B<C], [C<D], [D<E], [E<F]. If the certificate [C<D] fails, the list will be updated to {A,B,D,C,E,F}, and the certificates [B<C], [C<D], and [D<E], will be replaced with [B<D], [D<C], and [C<E], respectively. The new set of certificates will be [A<B], [B<D], [D<C], [C<E], [E<F]

== Analysis ==
This kinetic data structure is:

- Responsive: a certificate failure causes one swap (which takes O(1) time) and O(1) certificate changes which take O(log n) time to reschedule
- Local: every element is involved in at most 2 certificates
- Compact: there are exactly n-1 certificates for a list of n elements
- Efficient: this data structure causes no extraneous internal events, every change in the ordering of the elements causes exactly one certificate failure.

== Generalization ==
This data structure can be generalized to a kinetic data structure which can return a sorted list of points in $O(n \log m)$ time and processes $O(\frac{n^2}{m})$ events total, assuming pseudo algebraic trajectories, where $m$ is a parameter of the data structure. Thus, a maintenance-time versus query-time tradeoff can be made to tune to specific applications.

In the generalized data structure, the points are partitioned arbitrarily into m subsets of size $O(\frac{n}{m})$, and kinetic sorted lists are maintained on the subsets. Each sorted sublist needs to process $O(\frac{n^2}{m^2})$ events (certificate failures) maximum, since there are $O(1)$ swaps of each of the $O(\frac{n^2}{m^2})$ pairs of elements. Thus the total time required to maintain the data structure is $O(\frac{n^2}{m})$. Requests for the sorted list can then be answered in $O(n\log m)$ by merging the sorted sublists with mergesort.
