= Voronoi =

Voronoi or Voronoy is a Slavic masculine surname; its feminine counterpart is Voronaya. It may refer to

- Georgy Voronoy (1868–1908), Russian and Ukrainian mathematician
  - Voronoi diagram
  - Weighted Voronoi diagram
  - Voronoi deformation density
  - Voronoi formula
  - Voronoi pole
  - Centroidal Voronoi tessellation
