= Georgy Voronoy =

Russian mathematician

- Георгий Вороной
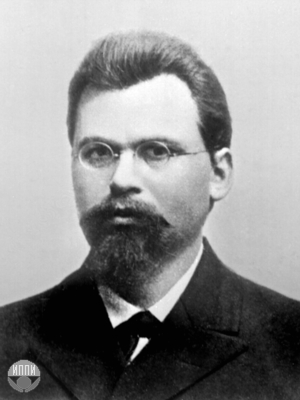
- Born: Georgy Feodosyevich Voronoy (Георгий Феодосьевич Вороной); 28 April 1868; Zhuravka, Poltava Governorate, Russian Empire
- Died: 20 November 1908 (aged 40); Warsaw, Congress Poland, Russian Empire
- Other names: Georgiy Feodosiyovich Voronyi (Георгій Феодосійович Вороний; Russian Empire
- Education: Saint Petersburg University
- Known for: Voronoi diagram (Voronoy Tessellation); Voronoi iteration Voronoi formula
- Scientific career
- Fields: Continued fractions
- Workplaces: University of Warsaw
- Doctoral advisor: Andrey Markov
- Doctoral students: Wacław Sierpiński; Boris Delaunay

Georgy Feodosevich Voronoy (Russian: Георгий Феодосьевич Вороной; Ukrainian: Георгій Феодосійович Вороний; 28 April 1868 – 20 November 1908) was an Imperial Russian mathematician of Ukrainian descent noted for defining the Voronoi diagram.

== Biography ==
Voronoy was born in the village of Zhuravka, Pyriatyn, in the Poltava Governorate, which was a part of the Russian Empire at that time and is in Varva Raion, Chernihiv Oblast, Ukraine.

Beginning in 1889, Voronoy studied at Saint Petersburg University, where he was a student of Andrey Markov. In 1894 he defended his master's thesis On algebraic integers depending on the roots of an equation of third degree. In the same year, Voronoy became a professor at the University of Warsaw, where he worked on continued fractions. In 1897 he defended his doctoral thesis On a generalisation of a continuous fraction. He was an Invited Speaker of the ICM in 1904 at Heidelberg.

When he was only 40 years of age, Voronoy began having stomach problems. He wrote in his diary:

I am making great progress with the question under study [indefinite quadratic forms]; however, at the same time my health is becoming worse and worse. Yesterday I had for the first time a clear idea of the algorithm in the theory of forms I am investigating, but also suffered a strong attack of bilious colic which prevented me from working in the evening and from sleeping the whole night. I am so afraid that the results of my enduring efforts, obtained with such difficulty, will perish along with me.

Following a severe gall bladder attack, Voronoy died on 20 November 1908.

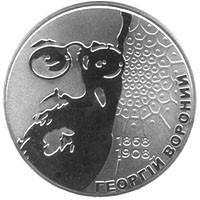
Two-hryvnia coin commemorating the centenary of Voronoy

== Works ==
Voronoy introduced the concept of what are today called Voronoi diagrams or tessellations. They are used in many areas of science, such as the analysis of spatially distributed data, having become an important topic in geophysics, meteorology, condensed matter physics, and Lie groups.

These tessellations are widely used in many areas of computer graphics, from architecture to film making and video games. Blender 3D includes a Voronoi texture generator as one of its main sources of randomly generated images, that can be applied as textures for many different uses.

== Legacy ==
Among his students was Wacław Sierpiński (Ph.D. at Jagiellonian University in 1906). Although he was not formally the doctoral advisor of Boris Delaunay (Ph.D. at Kyiv University), his influence on the latter earns him the right to be considered so.

In 2008 Ukraine released two-hryvnia coins commemorating the centenary of Voronoy's death.

== Family ==
In 1895 he had a son with his wife Olga Mytrofanivna, named Yurii Voronyi, who became a prominent transplant surgeon who performed the world's first human-to-human kidney transplant in 1933, volunteered for the army of Central Council of Ukraine, and fought in the Battle of Kruty. His daughter Mariia Vorona-Vasylenko became a teacher of Ukrainian language.

== See also ==
- Bowyer–Watson algorithm
- Centroidal Voronoi tessellation
- Delaunay triangulation
- Fortune's algorithm
- Laguerre–Voronoi diagram
- Voronoi deformation density
- Voronoi formula
- Voronoi iteration
- Voronoi pole
- Weighted Voronoi diagram
- Wigner–Seitz cell
