= Voronyi =

Voronyi is a Ukrainian surname. Notable people with the surname include:

- Mykola Voronyi, Ukrainian writer, poet, actor, director, and political activist.
- Yurii Voronyi, Ukrainian surgeon

== See also ==
- Voronoi (disambiguation)
