= Multiple line segment intersection =

In computational geometry, the multiple line segment intersection problem supplies a list of line segments in the Euclidean plane and asks whether any two of them intersect (cross).

Simple algorithms examine each pair of segments. However, if a large number of possibly intersecting segments are to be checked, this becomes increasingly inefficient since most pairs of segments are not close to one another in a typical input sequence. The most common, and more efficient, way to solve this problem for a high number of segments is to use a sweep line algorithm, where we imagine a line sliding across the line segments and we track which line segments it intersects at each point in time using a dynamic data structure based on binary search trees. The Shamos–Hoey algorithm applies this principle to solve the line segment intersection detection problem, as stated above, of determining whether or not a set of line segments has an intersection; the Bentley–Ottmann algorithm works by the same principle to list all intersections in logarithmic time per intersection.

== See also ==
- Bentley–Ottmann algorithm
