= JFA =

JFA may refer to:

== Football associations ==
- Japan Football Association
- Jersey Football Association
- Johor Football Association
- Jordan Football Association

== Other uses ==
- JFA (band), an American hardcore punk band
- Jazz Foundation of America
- Jewish Future Alliance
- Journal of the Fantastic in the Arts
- Judo Federation of Australia
- Junkers-Fokker Aktiengesellschaft or Jfa, a collaborative aircraft manufacturere in Imperial German; see Junkers
- Phoenix Wright: Ace Attorney − Justice for All, a 2002 video game
- Jump Flooding Algorithm
