= Yurii Voronyi =

Ukrainian surgeon (1895–1961)

- Юрій Юрійович Вороний
- Born: August 9, 1895; Zhuravka, Poltava Governorate, Russian Empire
- Died: May 13, 1961 (aged 65); Kyiv, Ukrainian SSR, Soviet Union
- Burial place: Baikove Cemetery
- Education: Faculty of Medicine of the Kyiv Imperial University of St. Volodymyr
- Occupation: Surgeon
- Medical career
- Sub-specialties: Organ transplants

Yurii Voronyi (also transliterated as Yurii Voronoy; 9 August 1895 – 13 May 1961) was a Ukrainian surgeon. He is known for having performed the first attempt to transplant an internal organ into a living person in 1933, although the recipient died soon after due to transplant rejection, and it took until Joseph E. Murray for a similar operation to be successful.

Born in Zhuravka, Voronyi was the son of mathematician Georgy Voronoy. In 1913, he entered the Faculty of Medicine at the Kyiv Imperial University of St. Volodymyr, but interrupted his studies to work as a medic during World War I, and then was part of the Ukrainian People's Army. In 1921, he graduated from the re-named Kyiv Medical Institute, where he became a postgraduate student before going to Kharkiv in 1926 to study at Kharkiv National Medical University. This was the place where Voronyi likely became interested in blood transfusion and transplantation, after Serge Voronoff's experiments. In 1931, he moved to Kherson to work at the city hospital, where he performed the experiment in 1933. In 1936 he was transferred to Kharkiv, where he stayed at during the Nazi occupation of Ukraine until 1942, when he started worked as a medic and helping various Red Army units. He then settled in the Zhytomyr region in 1943, but was transferred again in 1950 to Kyiv, where he worked at until his death in 1961 at various institutes.

== Early life ==
Voronyi was born on 9 August 1895 in Zhuravka, which was located in the Poltava Governorate in the Russian Empire at the time of his birth. His parents were Olga Mytrofanivna (nee Krytska) and Georgy Voronoy, who was a mathematician who defined the Voronoi diagram. His grandfather, Feodosii Voronyi, was a philologist and professor at a Nizhyn lycée. Yurii also had three sisters and a brother, his brother Alexander was a surgeon who worked with the gastrointestinal tract.

He first studied at the Warsaw Gymnasium, learning German and Polish, but when his father died of kidney disease the family returned to Ukraine (part of the Russian Empire back then) and he enrolled at the Pryluky Men's Gymnasium where he completed his studies.

== Medical career ==
In 1913, after graduating from the gymnasium, he entered the Faculty of Medicine of the Kyiv Imperial University of St. Volodymyr. However, soon after, his studies were interrupted by the First World War and he volunteered to work as a medic for the South-Western Regional Zemstvo Committee for sick and wounded soldiers and for the Red Cross. In 1917 he joined the Ukrainian People's Army. One of the battles he participated in, notably, during his time in the army was as part of a detachment of students during the Battle of Kruty on 16 January 1918, where he tried to stop incoming Russian forces led by Mikhail Artemyevich Muravyov, which was ultimately successful.

In 1921 after the war he graduated from St. Volodymyr, which was re-named to the Kyiv Medical Institute and became a postgraduate student in the institute's Department of Surgery. During his postgraduate years he did experimentation at a clinic, Kyiv City Clinical Hospital #18, under Oleksandr Chernyakhivsky in kidney transplantation. In 1923 he became an assistant at the Department of Surgey in Kyiv, and in 1926 he finished his postgraduate studies so he moved to Kharkiv to study under Volodymyr Shamov at the Kharkiv National Medical University. At the Kharkiv institute, he became interested in blood transfusion and testicular transplantation because of the department's interest in it due to a sudden uptake of interest after Serge Voronoff toured Europe stating that the transplantation of the testis from monkeys to humans was an anti-aging therapy. In 1930 at the All-Union Congress of Physiologists he demonstrated the work he had done at Kharkiv of a kidney transplant, which was attached to the right side of a dog's neck, and then later that key he demonstrated a kidney transplanted with a vascular structure under the skin of the neck.

In 1931 he then moved to Kherson to work as the chief physician at the hospital in the city, which allowed him to take on emergency surgical treatment. There he also became Director of the Kherson Evening Production Medical Institute where he trained doctors and was head of the Department of Topographic Anatomy.

=== Surgery (1933) ===
On 3 April 1933 a 26-year-old woman came to the Kherson hospital with acute renal failure following the consumption of mercuric chloride after a suicide attempt. (Note: The attempt has been stated as either having occurred in 1933 or 1936, although 1936 is probably incorrect and was instead simply the year of the publication of the attempt by Vorony.) Previously, on 31 March 1933, a moribund patient had come to the hospital with a fracture in their skull's base.

Under the anesthetic procaine, Voronoy made an incision in the middle ventro-medial part of the right thigh of the 26-year-old, and prepared the blood vessels to connect them to the kidney. Vorony then removed the kidney from the donor, who had been dead for six hours at the time of removal, and kept the blood vessels intact and then his team placed the kidney into the thigh incision. He then connected the blood vessels of the kidney to the 26-year-old's thigh blood vessel using Carrel's method and routed the ureter through an opening in the thigh and was sutured. Capillary bleeding was observed in the visible part of the ureter, which demonstrated that the kidney was working, however urine production soon stopped after the end of the operation, although this was similar to what happened in his 1930 experiment with the dog. At first, Vorony noticed no particular signs of worry and some lucid urine came out of the ureter but two days after the end of the operation the patient started vomiting and convulsing and her condition significantly worsened. On 5 April 1933, at 9:40 p.m., the patient died 48 hours after the operation.

The attempt ended in failure because the kidney from a cadaver donor of B+ blood type was transplanted to the woman who had an O+ blood type, which violated the rules of tissue transfer and because at the time the donor had already been dead for six hours. However, this did made Voronyi the first person to have performed kidney allotransplantation, although his attempt was not successful and it took until Jean Hamburger for a similar attempt to be for a short time successful and until Joseph E. Murray for it to be long term.

=== Post-1933 ===
In 1934 he became a senior researcher of the All-Ukrainian Institute of Emergency Surgery and Blood Transfusion, and in 1935 was awarded with the degree Candidate of Medical Sciences. He was also elected to the Kherson City Council and became a delegate to the Odessa Regional Congress, but in 1936 was transferred by orders of the government to Kharkiv again. Upon moving to Kharkiv, he became head of the Department of Surgery of the Kharkiv Dental Institute until 1941.

During the Nazi occupation of Ukraine, in 1941 he was relieved from his position at the dental institute and was transferred to the Kharkiv City Health Department in occupied territory until it was burnt down in 1942. Afterward, from 1942 to 1943, he worked as the village doctor at Nova Vodolaha but was captured in February 1943 by the Germans after treating wounded soldiers from the 8th Guards Division. In December 1943, he escaped from captivity and went to help the 273rd Regiment in Yanushevichi in the Zhytomyr region and then was the Head of the Zhytomyr Regional hospital. He worked there until 1950 when he was transferred to be the Head of the Department of Experimental Surgery of the Institute of Experimental Biology and Pathology in Kyiv, and in 1952 was awarded with the degree of Doctor of Medical Sciences. From 1953 to 1961 he was then Head of the Department of Blood Substitutes at the Institute of Transfusion in Kyiv.

== Personal life ==
Voronyi was married to Vira Nechaivska (1895–1972), who was a member of the Central Rada from the Union of Ukrainian Women.

=== Death ===
Voronyi died on 13 May 1961 in Kyiv, where he had been working. He was buried at Baikove Cemetery.
