= Voronoi formula =

Mathematical formula in harmonic analysis

In mathematics, a Voronoi formula is an equality involving Fourier coefficients of automorphic forms, with the coefficients twisted by additive characters on either side. It can be regarded as a Poisson summation formula for non-abelian groups. The Voronoi (summation) formula for GL(2) has long been a standard tool for studying analytic properties of automorphic forms and their L-functions. There have been numerous results coming out the Voronoi formula on GL(2). The concept is named after Georgy Voronoy.

== Classical application ==
To Voronoy and his contemporaries, the formula appeared tailor-made to evaluate certain finite sums. That seemed significant because several important questions in number theory involve finite sums of arithmetic quantities. In this connection, let us mention two classical examples, Dirichlet's divisor problem and the Gauss circle problem. The former estimates the size of d(n), the number of positive divisors of an integer n. Dirichlet proved

$$D(X)= \sum_{n=1}^X d(n) - X \log X - (2\gamma -1)X=O(X^{1/2})$$

where $\gamma$ is Euler's constant ≈ 0.57721566. Gauss’ circle problem concerns the average size of

$$r_2 (n) = \#\{(x,y) \in \mathbb{Z}^2 \mid x^2 + y^2 = n\},$$

for which Gauss gave the estimate

$$\Delta(X)=\sum_{n=1}^X r_2 (n)-\pi X=O(X^{1/2}).$$

Each problem has a geometric interpretation, with D(X) counting lattice points in the region $\{x,y > 0, xy\leq X\}$, and $\Delta(X)$ lattice points in the disc $\{x^2 + y^2 \leq X\}$. These two bounds are related, as we shall see, and come from fairly elementary considerations. In the series of papers Voronoy developed geometric and analytic methods to improve both Dirichlet’s and Gauss’ bound. Most importantly in retrospect, he generalized the formula by allowing weighted sums, at the expense of introducing more general integral operations on f than the Fourier transform.

== Modern formulation ==
Let ƒ be a Maass cusp form for the modular group PSL(2,Z) and a(n) its Fourier coefficients. Let a,c be integers with (a,c) = 1. Let ω be a well-behaved test function. The Voronoi formula for ƒ states

$$\sum_n  a(n)e(an/c)\omega(n) = \sum_n a(n)e(-\bar a n/c)\Omega(n),$$

where $\bar{a}$ is a multiplicative inverse of a modulo c and Ω is a certain integral Hankel transform of ω. (see Good (1984))
