= Bowyer–Watson algorithm =

Computation method in geometry

In computational geometry, the Bowyer–Watson algorithm is a method for computing the Delaunay triangulation of a finite set of points in any number of dimensions. The algorithm can be also used to obtain a Voronoi diagram of the points, which is the dual graph of the Delaunay triangulation.

== Description ==
The Bowyer–Watson algorithm is an incremental algorithm. It works by adding points, one at a time, to a valid Delaunay triangulation of a subset of the desired points. After every insertion, any triangles whose circumcircles contain the new point are deleted, leaving a star-shaped polygonal hole which is then re-triangulated using the new point. By using the connectivity of the triangulation to efficiently locate triangles to remove, the algorithm can take O(N log N) operations to triangulate N points, although special degenerate cases exist where this goes up to O(N^{2}).

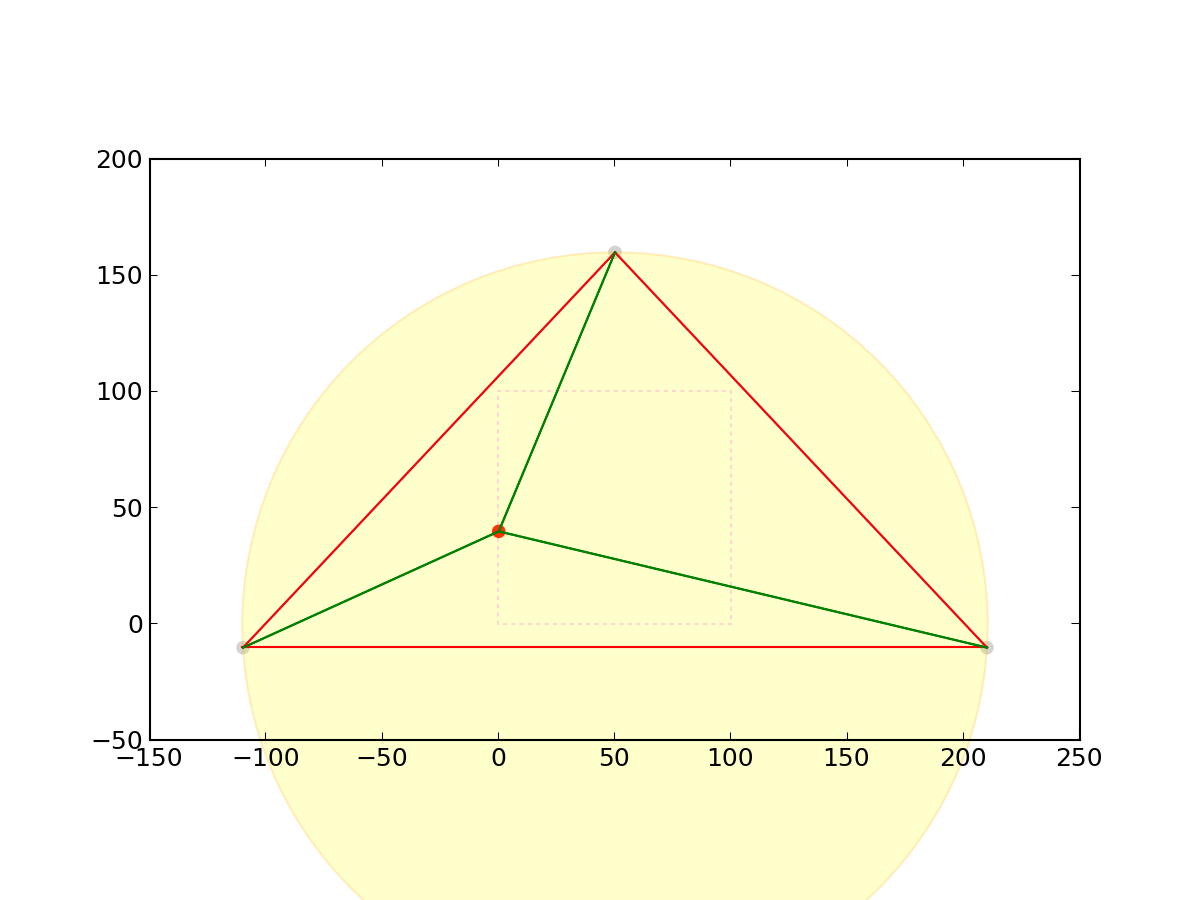
First step: insert a node in an enclosing "super"-triangle

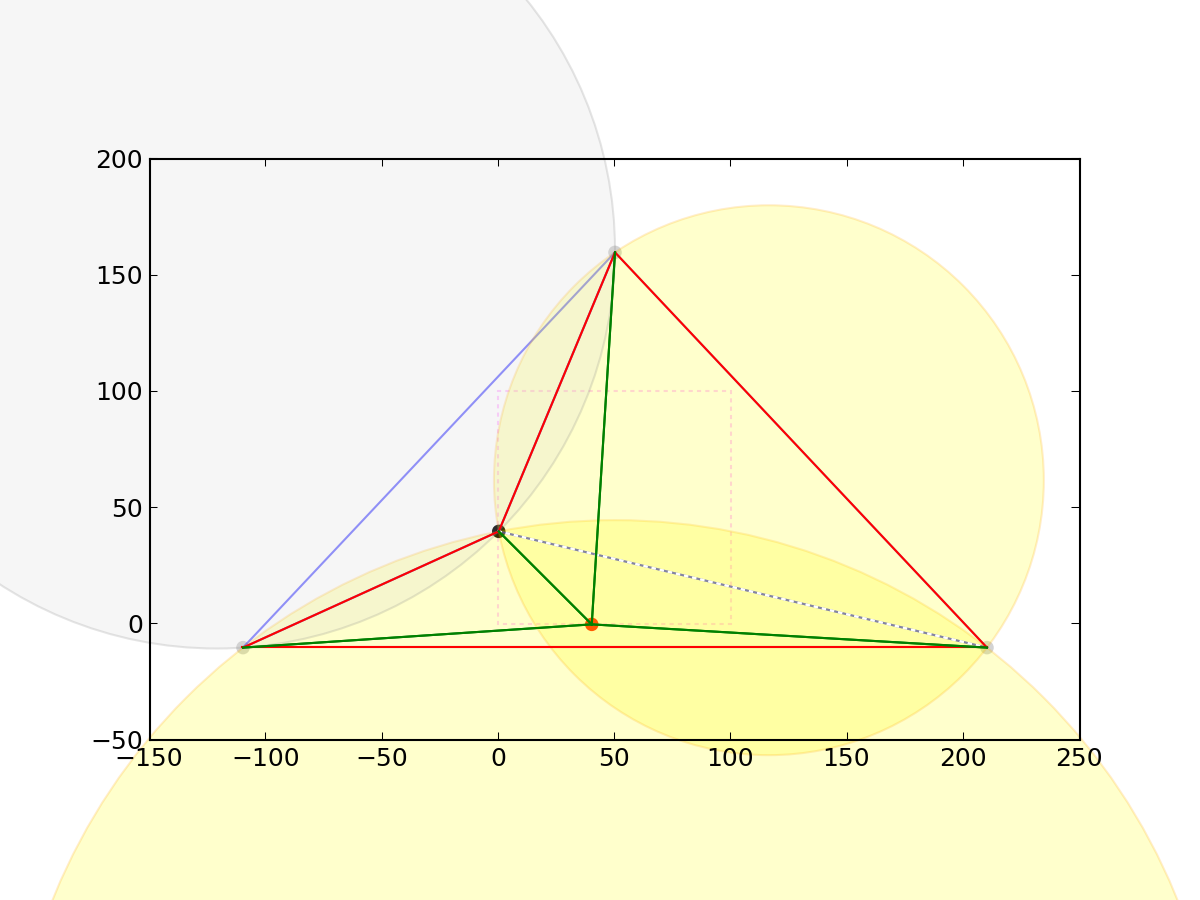
Insert second node

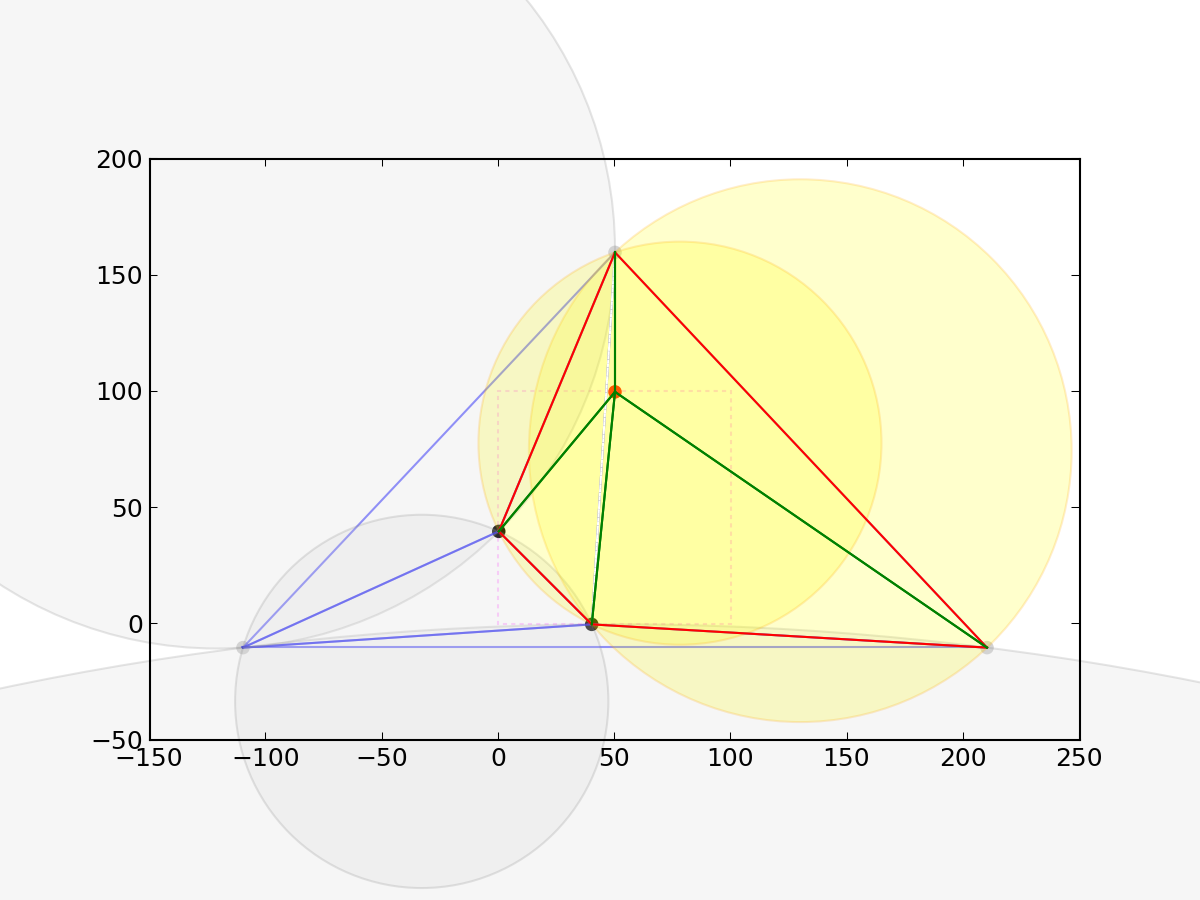
Insert third node

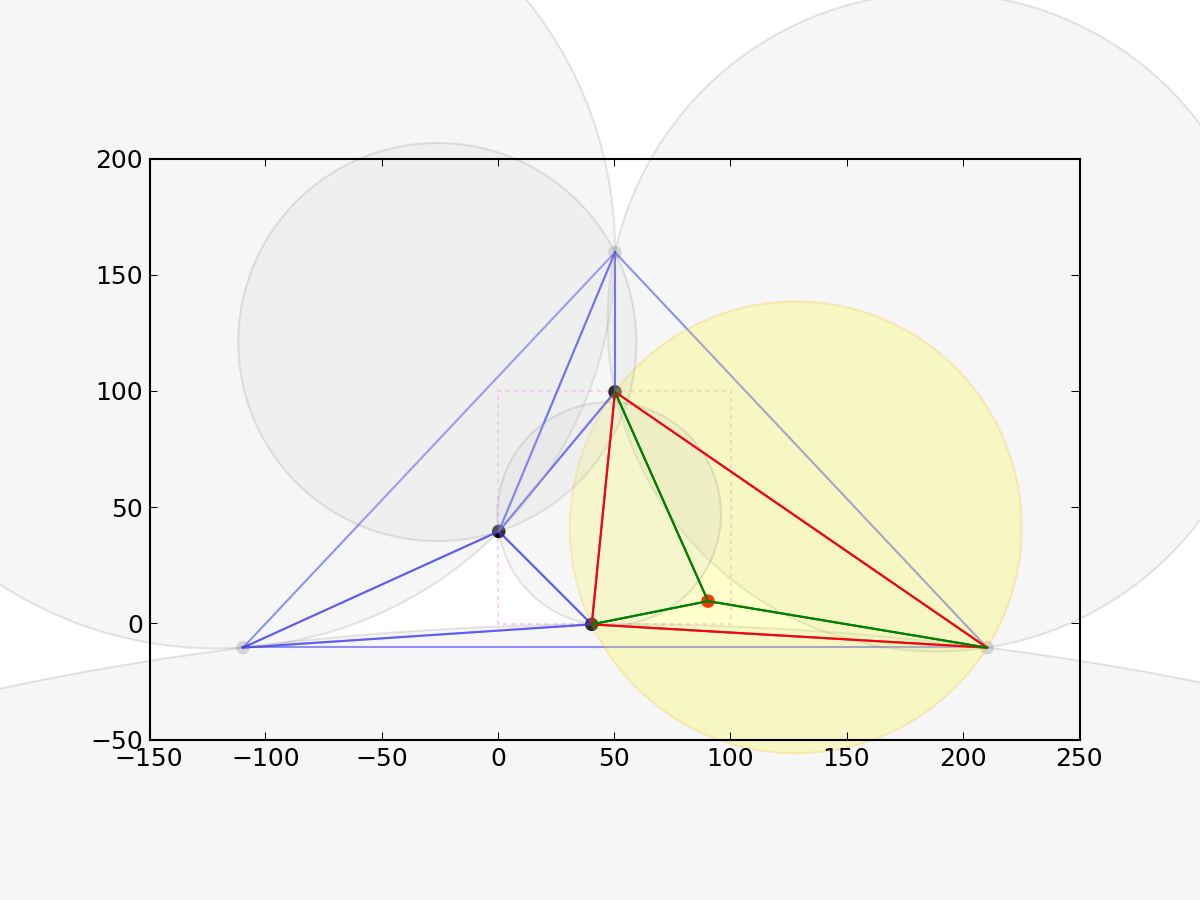
Insert fourth node

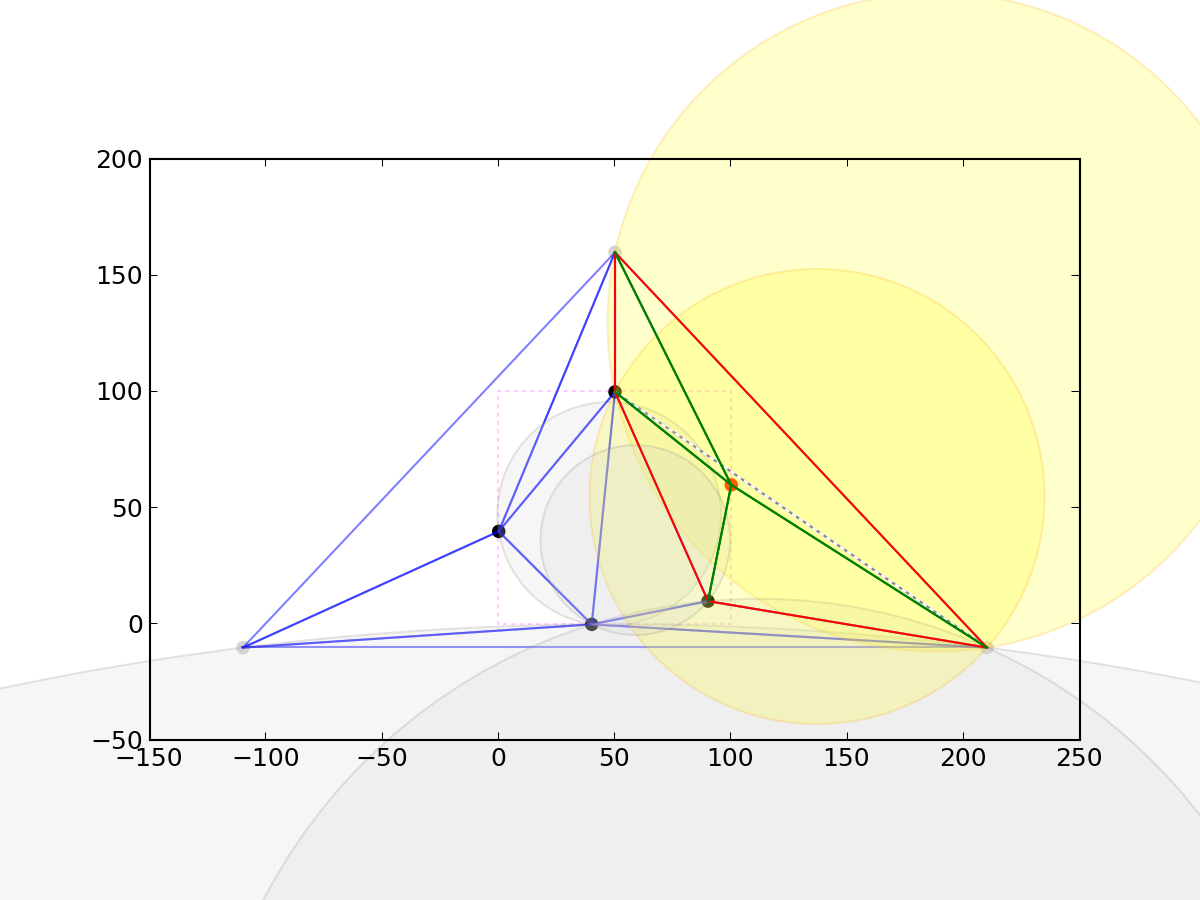
Insert fifth (and last) node

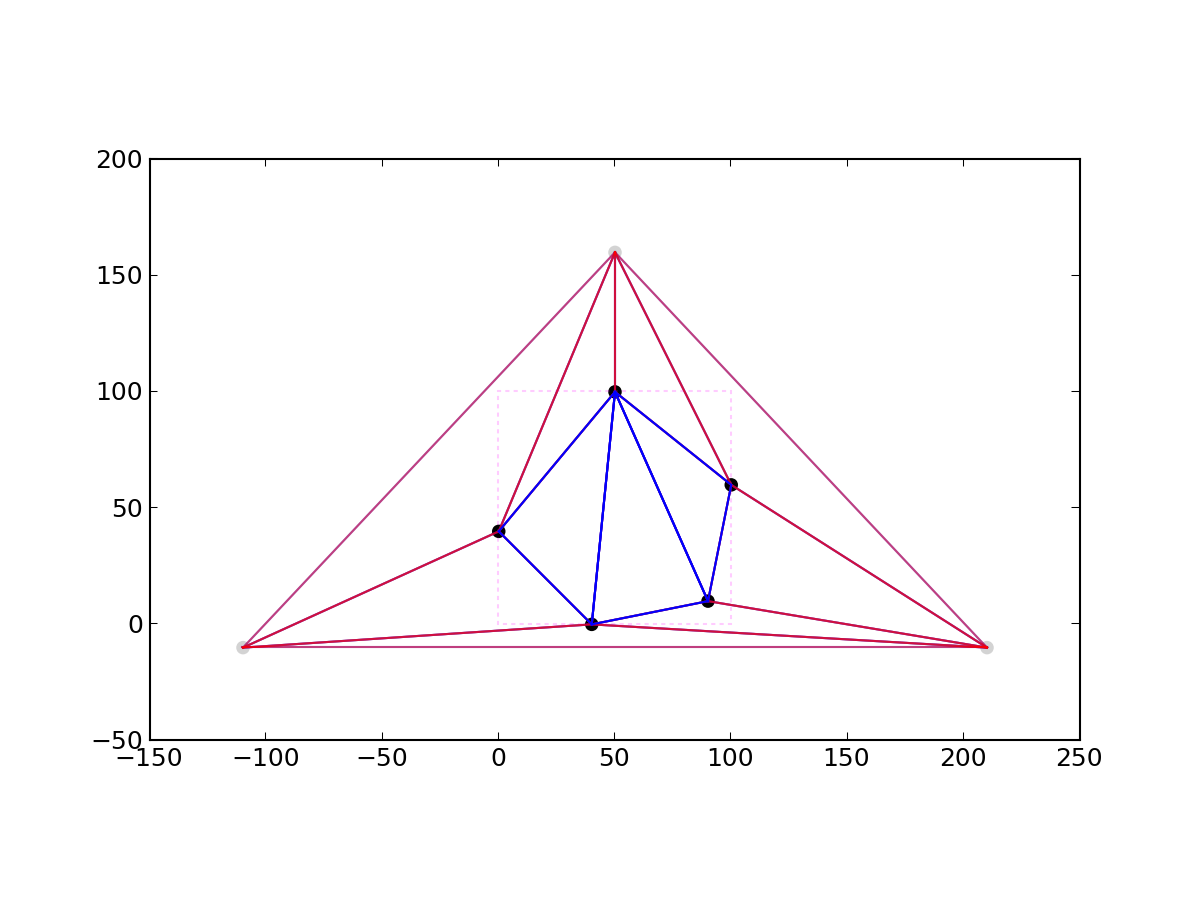
Remove edges with extremes in the super-triangle

== History ==
The algorithm is sometimes known just as the Bowyer Algorithm or the Watson Algorithm. Adrian Bowyer and David Watson devised it independently of each other at the same time, and each published a paper on it in the same issue of The Computer Journal (see below).

== Pseudocode ==
The following pseudocode describes a basic implementation of the Bowyer–Watson algorithm. Its time complexity is $O(n^2)$. Efficiency can be improved in a number of ways. For example, the triangle connectivity can be used to locate the triangles which contain the new point in their circumcircle, without having to check all of the triangles - by doing so we can decrease time complexity to $O(n \log n)$. Pre-computing the circumcircles can save time at the expense of additional memory usage. And if the points are uniformly distributed, sorting them along a space filling Hilbert curve prior to insertion can also speed point location.

function BowyerWatson (pointList)
    // pointList is a set of coordinates defining the points to be triangulated
    triangulation := empty triangle mesh data structure
    add super-triangle to triangulation // must be large enough to completely contain all the points in pointList
    for each point in pointList do // add all the points one at a time to the triangulation
        badTriangles := empty set
        for each triangle in triangulation do // first find all the triangles that are no longer valid due to the insertion
            if point is inside circumcircle of triangle
                add triangle to badTriangles
        polygon := empty set
        for each triangle in badTriangles do // find the boundary of the polygonal hole
            for each edge in triangle do
                if edge is not shared by any other triangles in badTriangles
                    add edge to polygon
        for each triangle in badTriangles do // remove them from the data structure
            remove triangle from triangulation
        for each edge in polygon do // re-triangulate the polygonal hole
            newTri := form a triangle from edge to point
            add newTri to triangulation
    for each triangle in triangulation // done inserting points, now clean up
        if triangle contains a vertex from original super-triangle
            remove triangle from triangulation
    return triangulation
