= Power diagram =

Partition of the Euclidean plane

A power diagram of four circles

In computational geometry, a power diagram, also called a Laguerre–Voronoi diagram, Dirichlet cell complex, radical Voronoi tesselation or a sectional Dirichlet tesselation, is a partition of the Euclidean plane into polygonal cells defined from a set of circles. The cell for a given circle C consists of all the points for which the power distance to C is smaller than the power distance to the other circles. The power diagram is a form of generalized Voronoi diagram, and coincides with the Voronoi diagram of the circle centers in the case that all the circles have equal radii.

== Definition ==
The power of a point P outside of a given circle

If C is a circle and P is a point outside C, then the power of P with respect to C is the square of the length of a line segment from P to a point T of tangency with C. Equivalently, if P has distance d from the center of the circle, and the circle has radius r, then (by the Pythagorean theorem) the power is d^{2} − r^{2}. The same formula d^{2} − r^{2} may be extended to all points in the plane, regardless of whether they are inside or outside of C: points on C have zero power, and points inside C have negative power.

The power diagram of a set of n circles C_{i} is a partition of the plane into n regions R_{i} (called cells), such that a point P belongs to R_{i} whenever circle C_{i} is the circle minimizing the power of P.

The radical axis of two intersecting circles. The power diagram of the two circles is the partition of the plane into two halfplanes formed by this line.

In the case n = 2, the power diagram consists of two halfplanes, separated by a line called the radical axis or chordale of the two circles. Along the radical axis, both circles have equal power. More generally, in any power diagram, each cell R_{i} is a convex polygon, the intersection of the halfspaces bounded by the radical axes of circle C_{i} with each other circle. Triples of cells meet at vertices of the diagram, which are the radical centers of the three circles whose cells meet at the vertex.

== Related constructions ==
The power diagram may be seen as a weighted form of the Voronoi diagram of a set of point sites, a partition of the plane into cells within which one of the sites is closer than all the other sites. Other forms of weighted Voronoi diagram include the additively weighted Voronoi diagram, in which each site has a weight that is added to its distance before comparing it to the distances to the other sites, and the multiplicatively weighted Voronoi diagram, in which the weight of a site is multiplied by its distance before comparing it to the distances to the other sites. In contrast, in the power diagram, we may view each circle center as a site, and each circle's squared radius as a weight that is subtracted from the squared Euclidean distance before comparing it to other squared distances. In the case that all the circle radii are equal, this subtraction makes no difference to the comparison, and the power diagram coincides with the Voronoi diagram.

A planar power diagram may also be interpreted as a planar cross-section of an unweighted three-dimensional Voronoi diagram. In this interpretation, the set of circle centers in the cross-section plane are the perpendicular projections of the three-dimensional Voronoi sites, and the squared radius of each circle is a constant K minus the squared distance of the corresponding site from the cross-section plane, where K is chosen large enough to make all these radii positive.

Like the Voronoi diagram, the power diagram may be generalized to Euclidean spaces of any dimension. The power diagram of n spheres in d dimensions is combinatorially equivalent to the intersection of a set of n upward-facing halfspaces in d + 1 dimensions, and vice versa.

== Algorithms and applications ==
Two-dimensional power diagrams may be constructed by an algorithm that runs in time O(n log n). More generally, because of the equivalence with higher-dimensional halfspace intersections, d-dimensional power diagrams (for d > 2) may be constructed by an algorithm that runs in time $O(n^{\lceil d/2\rceil})$.

The power diagram may be used as part of an efficient algorithm for computing the volume of a union of spheres. Intersecting each sphere with its power diagram cell gives its contribution to the total union, from which the volume may be computed in time proportional to the complexity of the power diagram.

Other applications of power diagrams include data structures for testing whether a point belongs to a union of disks, algorithms for constructing the boundary of a union of disks, and algorithms for finding the closest two balls in a set of balls. It is also used for solving the semi-discrete optimal transportation problem which in turn has numerous applications, such as early universe reconstruction or fluid dynamics.

== History ==
Aurenhammer (1987) traces the definition of the power distance to the work of 19th-century mathematicians Edmond Laguerre and Georgy Voronoy. Fejes Tóth (1977) defined power diagrams and used them to show that the boundary of a union of n circular disks can always be illuminated from at most 2n point light sources. Power diagrams have appeared in the literature under other names including the "Laguerre–Voronoi diagram", "Dirichlet cell complex", "radical Voronoi tesselation" and "sectional Dirichlet tesselation".
