= Alasdair Turner =

British computer scientist and academic (1969–2011)

- Patrick Alasdair Fionn Turner
- Born: October 19, 1969; London, England
- Died: October 6, 2011 (aged 41)
- Education: University of Cambridge (MA); University of Edinburgh (MSc)
- Known for: Visibility graph analysis, UCL Depthmap
- Scientific career
- Fields: Computer science, Space syntax, Architectural computing

Patrick Alasdair Fionn Turner (19 October 1969 – 6 October 2011) was a British computer scientist and academic. He was a prominent figure at the VR Centre for the Built Environment and the Space Group at University College London (UCL). Turner's research significantly influenced the development of space syntax theory, particularly through his work on dynamic agent models and spatial analysis.

== Education and early career ==
Turner was born on 19 October 1969 in London. He earned a Master of Arts in Natural Sciences from the University of Cambridge and a Master of Science in Artificial Intelligence from the University of Edinburgh. In 2011, he was appointed a Reader in Urban and Architectural Computing at University College London.

== Research and contributions ==
Turner's research focused on the intersection of architecture, urban design, and the underlying computational systems of socio-physical environments. He developed models centered on the "structural coupling" between human agents and their background environment.

=== Agent-based modeling ===
Turner proposed that human movement patterns consist of two distinct types:

- Natural movement: A product of an agent's visual field and the spatial affordances of the built environment.
- Navigational movement: Learned patterns where agents retrieve spatial memory to reach specific destinations.

He implemented neural network methods to control agent behavior, aiming to create an "Ecomorphic" model where collective movement patterns and environmental formation share a reciprocal relationship. Working with Alan Penn, he introduced the concept of "exosomatic visual architecture," a paradigm where environmental configurations outside the body guide cognitive movement decisions.

=== Visibility graph analysis and Depthmap ===
Building upon the space syntax theory established by Bill Hillier and Julienne Hanson, Turner introduced visibility graph analysis (VGA) alongside Alan Penn, David O'Sullivan, and Maria Doxa. VGA represents space as intervisibility relationships within a grid, allowing for more granular analysis than traditional axial lines.

Turner authored the UCL Depthmap software, an open-source platform that integrated space syntax methods with his agent-based models. Depthmap became a primary tool for researchers in the field of urban morphology.

== Teaching and art ==
Turner was the founder of the MSc in Adaptive Architecture and Computation at the Bartlett School of Architecture, UCL. He was an early adopter of the Processing programming language for architectural and creative design. His interests often overlapped with generative art and code explorations.

== Death ==
Turner died on 6 October 2011 following a long struggle with stomach cancer.

== See also ==
- Isovist
- Spatial network
- Visibility graph analysis
