= Computational archaeology =

Archaeological sub-discipline

Computational archaeology is a subfield of digital archeology that focuses on the analysis and interpretation of archaeological data using advanced computational techniques. There are differences between the terms "Computational Archaeology" and "Computer in Archaeology", though they are related to each other. This field employs data modeling, statistical analysis, and computer simulations to understand and reconstruct past human behaviors and societal developments. By leveraging Geographic Information Systems (GIS), predictive modeling, and various simulation tools, computational archaeology enhances the ability to process complex archaeological datasets, providing deeper insights into historical contexts and cultural heritage.

Diagram showing major methodological areas within computational archaeology and their links

Computational archaeology may include the use of geographical information systems (GIS), especially when applied to spatial analyses such as viewshed analysis and least-cost path analysis as these approaches are sufficiently computationally complex that they are extremely difficult if not impossible to implement without the processing power of a computer. Likewise, some forms of statistical and mathematical modelling, and the computer simulation of human behaviour and behavioural evolution using software tools such as Swarm or Repast would also be impossible to calculate without computational aid. The application of a variety of other forms of complex and bespoke software to solve archaeological problems, such as human perception and movement within built environments using software such as University College London's Space Syntax program, also falls under the term 'computational archaeology'. Other examples of computational archaeology include semantic approach towards machine learning, such as data ontology or the CIDOC Conceptual Reference Model, used in the British Museum's ResearchSpace, Arches, and the Global Rock Art Database.

The acquisition, documentation and analysis of archaeological finds at excavations and in museums is an important field having pottery analysis as one of the major topics. In this area 3D-acquisition techniques like structured light scanning (SLS), photogrammetric methods like "structure from motion" (SfM), computed tomography as well as their combinations provide large data-sets of numerous objects for digital pottery research. These techniques are increasingly integrated into the in-situ workflow of excavations. The Austrian subproject of the Corpus vasorum antiquorum (CVA) is seminal for digital research on finds within museums.

Computational archaeology is also known as "archaeological informatics" (Burenhult 2002, Huggett and Ross 2004) or "archaeoinformatics" (sometimes abbreviated as "AI", but not to be confused with artificial intelligence).

== Origins and objectives ==
In recent years, it has become clear that archaeologists will only be able to harvest the full potential of quantitative methods and computer technology if they become aware of the specific pitfalls and potentials inherent in the archaeological data and research process. AI science is an emerging discipline that attempts to uncover, quantitatively represent and explore specific properties and patterns of archaeological information. Fundamental research on data and methods for a self-sufficient archaeological approach to information processing produces quantitative methods and computer software specifically geared towards archaeological problem solving and understanding.

AI science is capable of complementing and enhancing almost any area of scientific archaeological research. It incorporates a large part of the methods and theories developed in quantitative archaeology since the 1960s but goes beyond former attempts at quantifying archaeology by exploring ways to represent general archaeological information and problem structures as computer algorithms and data structures. This opens archaeological analysis to a wide range of computer-based information processing methods fit to solve problems of great complexity. It also promotes a formalized understanding of the discipline's research objects and creates links between archaeology and other quantitative disciplines, both in methods and software technology. Its agenda can be split up in two major research themes that complement each other:

1. Fundamental research (theoretical AI science) on the structure, properties and possibilities of archaeological data, inference and knowledge building. This includes modeling and managing fuzziness and uncertainty in archaeological data, scale effects, optimal sampling strategies and spatio-temporal effects.
2. Development of computer algorithms and software (applied AI science) that make this theoretical knowledge available to the user.

There is already a large body of literature on the use of quantitative methods and computer-based analysis in archaeology. The development of methods and applications is best reflected in the annual publications of the CAA conference (see external links section at bottom). At least two journals, the Italian Archeologia e Calcolatori and the British Archaeological Computing Newsletter, are dedicated to archaeological computing methods. AI Science contributes to many fundamental research topics, including but not limited to:

- advanced statistics in archaeology, spatial and temporal archaeological data analysis
- bayesian analysis and advanced probability models, fuzziness and uncertainty in archaeological data
- scale-related phenomena and scale transgressions
- intrasite analysis (representations of stratigraphy, 3D analysis, artefact distributions)
- landscape analysis (territorial modeling, visibility analysis)
- optimal survey and sampling strategies
- process-based modeling and simulation models
- archaeological predictive modeling and heritage management applications
- supervised and unsupervised classification and typology, artificial intelligence applications
- digital excavations and virtual reality
- computational reproducibility of archaeological research
- archaeological software development, electronic data sharing and publishing

AI science advocates a formalized approach to archaeological inference and knowledge building. It is interdisciplinary in nature, borrowing, adapting and enhancing method and theory from numerous other disciplines such as computer science (e.g. algorithm and software design, database design and theory), geoinformation science (spatial statistics and modeling, geographic information systems), artificial intelligence research (supervised classification, fuzzy logic), ecology (point pattern analysis), applied mathematics (graph theory, probability theory) and statistics.

== Training and research ==
Scientific progress in archaeology, as in any other discipline, requires building abstract, generalized and transferable knowledge about the processes that underlie past human actions and their manifestations. Quantification provides a way of abstracting and extending scientific abilities past the limits of intuitive cognition. Quantitative approaches to archaeological information handling and inference constitute a critical body of scientific methods in archaeological research. They provide the tools, algebra, statistics and computer algorithms, to process information too voluminous or complex for purely cognitive, informal inference. They also build a bridge between archaeology and numerous quantitative sciences such as geophysics, geoinformation sciences and applied statistics. And they allow archaeological scientists to design and carry out research in a formal, transparent and comprehensible way.

Being an emerging field of research, AI science is currently a rather dispersed discipline in need of stronger, well-funded and institutionalized embedding, especially in academic teaching. Despite its evident progress and usefulness, today's quantitative archaeology is often inadequately represented in archaeological training and education. Part of this problem may be misconceptions about the seeming conflict between mathematics and humanistic archaeology.

Digital excavation technologies, modern heritage management practices, and increasingly complex archaeological research require students and researchers to develop methods for processing large and growing bodies of archaeological data. As a result, training in quantitative disciplines, including mathematics, statistics, and computer science, has become an increasingly important component of archaeological education and research.

Currently, universities based in the UK provide the largest share of study programmes for prospective quantitative archaeologists, with more institutes in Italy, Germany and the Netherlands developing a strong profile quickly. In Germany, the country's first lecturer's position in AI science ("Archäoinformatik") was established in 2005 at Kiel University. In April 2016 the first full professorship in Archaeoinformatics has been established at the University of Cologne (Institute of Archaeology).

The most important platform for students and researchers in quantitative archaeology and AI science is the international conference on Computer Applications and Quantitative Methods in Archaeology (CAA) which has been in existence for more than 30 years now and is held in a different city of Europe each year. Vienna's city archaeology unit also hosts an annual event that is quickly growing in international importance (see links at bottom).
