= Spatial network analysis software =

Type of Analytic Software

Spatial network analysis software packages are analytical software used to prepare graph-based analysis of spatial networks. They stem from research fields in transportation, architecture, and urban planning. The earliest examples of such software include the work of Garrison (1962), Kansky (1963), Levin (1964), Harary (1969), Rittel (1967), Tabor (1970) and others in the 1960s and 70s. Specific packages address their domain-specific needs, including TransCAD for transportation, GIS for planning and geography, and Axman for Space syntax researchers.

== Packages ==
Many packages are available. Many were developed in academia and are freely available or available for academic use.

In historical order:

- Axman – The (near) original developed by Nick Sheep Dalton of UCL to perform axial line analysis on computers running Mac OS, currently used in more than 50 countries. This spawned offshoots such as Pesh (for the analysis of convex space networks) and SpaceBox (for the analysis of 'all-line' axial maps).
- Spatialist – Developed at Georgia Institute of Technology to implement theoretical innovations principally introduced by John Peponis. This software plugs into the MicroStation CAD package to analyse networks of automatically generated 'e-spaces' and 's-spaces'.
- Axwoman 1 – Written by Bin Jiang while at UCL. It is a tool to perform axial analysis as a plug-in to ESRI products.
- Axwoman 6.2+ – Evolved from Axwoman 1.0 and research by Bin Jiang and his team. Axwoman 6.2 is a free plug-in to ArcMap 10, combined with AxialGen in one installer. Featured functionality includes automatically generating natural streets and axial lines from OpenStreetMap data. The website also contains tutorials.
- Depthmap – Developed by Alasdair Turner of UCL. This software initially generated isovists and performed visibility graph analysis of building systems on computers running Windows. It evolved to include automatic generation of axial line networks and analysis of axial line networks and road segment line networks at anything up to the level of the US or Europe.
- OmniVista – Developed by Nick Sheep Dalton and Ruth Conroy Dalton. It performs a range of isovist measures on Mac OS computers.
- Fathom – Commercial implementation of visibility graph analysis written by Intelligent Space Partnership.
- Mindwalk – Developed by Lucas Figueiredo, This software performs spatial analysis over standard axial maps and new continuity maps. It is written in Java and runs on several platforms. It is also known as xSpace. Mindwalk has been used as a research and teaching tool since 2002. It is distributed worldwide for academic and non-commercial purposes.
- Isovist Analyst – Written by Sanjay Rana while at UCL. This program creates isovists from building plans as a plug-in to ESRI products.
- Ajanachara – Open source software developed by Gerald Franz at the Max Planck Institute for Biological Cybernetics. It performs visibility graph analysis of 3D Studio Max and VRML models.
- Webmap – developed by N. S. Dalton at UCL. Software is free to use (although it requires registration). It allows users to analyse axial maps through a web browser interface.
- Confeego – Developed by Space Syntax Limited, but available free for academic use. It plugs directly into MapInfo Professional to analyse line axial networks.
- AJAX – Written by Mike Batty of UCL. It performs both traditional axial network analysis (Batty: primal analysis), and point-based visibility analysis introduced by Bin Jiang (Batty: dual analysis). In a recent paper, Batty showed the mathematical relationship between the two analyses.
- OverView – plug-in to AutoCad by Christian Derix for Aedas Architects in collaboration with the Center for Evolutionary Computing in Architecture CECA. Allows architects to do quick visual integration mapping via isovist analysis. Can analyse non-planar environments to take volumes and hilly sites into account.
- AXess – Written by Jennifer Brisbane at the City University of New York. It offers a context menu tool for ArcGIS 9.x that calculates connectivity, control, mean depth, global integration, and local integration for all nodes in an axial line layer.
- Webmap-At-Home – Written by Nick Sheep Dalton at Open University. It is a Java implementation of the original Axman program with extra features. It is a platform neutral full application capable of reading DXF files and the original Axman binary format.
- AxialGen – Written by Bin Jiang and Xintao Liu at the University of Gävle, Sweden. It is a plugin to ArcGIS 9.2 that automatically generates axial lines for a complex polygon with holes.
- Layout-iQ – Used in healthcare, manufacturing, banking, retail, and office space. It evaluates the frequency of flow in a workspace and measures the total minimum travel distance for resources to navigate the workspace. The software integrates CAD drawings with a diagram of flow between points.
- Urban Network Analysis Toolbox for ArcGIS – A free, open-source package developed by the City Form Lab. It can be used to compute five types of graph centrality measures on spatial networks: Reach; Gravity; Betweenness; Closeness; and Straightness. The tools incorporate three important features that make them particularly suited for spatial analysis on urban street networks. First, they can account for both geometry and topology in input networks, using either metric distance (e.g. Meters) or topological distance (e.g. Turns) as impedance factors. Unlike previous software tools that operate with two network elements (nodes and edges), UNA tools include a third network element – buildings – that are used as the spatial units of analysis for all measures. Two neighboring buildings on the same street segments can therefore obtain different accessibility results. UNA tools optionally allow buildings to be weighted according to their particular characteristics – e.g., volume, population. More important buildings can be specified to have a stronger effect on the analysis outcomes, yielding more accurate and reliable results. The toolbox is built for easy scaling – it is equally suited for small-scale, detailed network analysis of dense urban areas and for sparser large-scale regional networks. The toolbox requires ArcGIS 10 software with an ArcGIS Network Analyst Extension.
- Urban Network Analysis Plugin for Rhinoceros3D – Free for both academic and commercial use. It was developed by the City Form Lab. The Rhino UNA Toolbox can be used to compute five types of graph centrality measures on spatial networks: Reach; Gravity; Betweenness; Closeness; and Straightness. The toolbox includes other spatial analysis tools, such as Closest Facility, Alternative Routes finding, pedestrian flow modeling along shortest or redundant paths, facility patronage estimation, spatial distribution of origins weights along routes etc. The tool allows users to specify which origins and destinations to use in the analysis and allows the users to weight the analysis with specific attributes of each origin and destination. The toolbox was developed to make spatial network analysis tools available to architects, designers and planners who do not have access to GIS and typically work on designs in Rhino. Having UNA metrics in Rhino, allows one to analyze how a specific spatial network performs, and to incorporate the analysis into a fast and iterative design process, where networks can be designed, evaluated and redesigned in seamless cycles. The UNA Rhino toolbox is significantly faster than its GIS counterpart, which has been available as a plugin for ArcGIS since 2012. Users have an ability to rapidly create and edit networks from any Rhino curve objects, making network design and redesign simple and intuitive. The analytic options available to the user have expanded, providing more precise control to analyze exactly what you need for every unique spatial network problem. The toolbox requires Rhinoceros version 5 software as of SR 10 or later.
- SSA Plugin – Written by Burak Beyhan at Mersin University. Space Syntax Analysis (SSA) Plugin is operational on free and open source software for GIS (FOSS4GIS) including OpenJUMP, gvSIG, OrbisGIS, QGIS, OpenEV, Thuban, MapWindow GIS, SAGA, and R Project. SSA Plugin calculates the standard space syntax measures including connectivity, total depth, mean depth, global integration, local depth, local integration and control values for each feature involved in a spatial configuration, and intelligibility value for the whole of the configuration. Users can export an adjusted graph to an external file in a Social Network Analysis (SNA) file format for further analysis of the spatial configuration concerned in the respective software environment.
- depthmapX – Developed by the depthmapX development team. It is an open source multi-platform spatial network analyses package based on the original Depthmap. It can generate isovists and perform visibility graph analysis of building systems on computers running Mac OS X, Windows and Linux, it includes automatic generation of axial line networks and analysis of axial line networks and road segment line networks. depthmapX is based on Qt framework.
- Spatial Design Network Analysis (sDNA 3D) – Since 2011, it has been developed by Alain Chiaradia, Crispin Cooper and Chris Webster at Cardiff University and University of Hong Kong. It is a free tool that unifies the use of spatial network analysis in design and research. Plugins are provided for Autocad (for designers), ArcGIS, open source QGIS (for analysts & designers) and as a standalone Python version that works on 2D or 3D shapefiles enabling use in other GIS software and custom projects. sDNA standardizes on the network link as a unit of analysis, and computes a wide variety of closeness, betweenness, severance and efficiency measures. sDNA works with 3D topography and 3D multilevel environment. Analyses and Radius can use Euclidean, angular, topological or custom distance metrics including e.g. cyclist and pedestrian metrics; and link, length or custom weightings. In Angular analysis mode sDNA computes cumulative angular change along the link and angular change at junction resulting in angular geodesic.
- CASOS ORA – Developed by Dr. Kathleen M. Carley and the joint Carnegie Mellon University and Netanomics team. It is tools that support social and spatial network analysis. It is interoperable with other spatial analysis tools such as ARCGIS. See also Dynamic Network Analysis.
- Isovist_2-3 – Free software for Mac and PC that provides advanced, real-time, high definition isovist point, path and field analysis in architectural plan and section drawings. The software also includes several Space Syntax analysis tools for calculating high definition Integration, Mean Metric Depth, and Mean Angular Depth fields.

== See also ==
- Geospatial topology
- Space syntax
- Spatial network
- Urban planning
- Visibility graph analysis
- Fuzzy architectural spatial analysis
