= Cathedral effect =

Phenomenon in environmental psychology

The cathedral effect is a phenomenon in environmental psychology in which the perceived height of a ceiling influences cognition. High ceilings promote abstract and creative thinking, while low ceilings encourage focused, detail-oriented processing. The name refers to the tall interiors of cathedrals. No effect is observed when the ceiling height goes unnoticed.

== Background ==
The anthropologist Edward T. Hall introduced the concept of proxemics, the study of how people perceive and use space, in his 1966 book The Hidden Dimension. Hall argued that architectural design often neglects human spatial needs.

Work on ceiling height specifically began in the late 1970s. John Baird, Bernice Cassidy, and Jennifer Kurr found in 1978 that people prefer rooms with ceilings of about 10 feet (3.0 m), roughly two feet above the then-standard residential ceiling, and that preference drops for ceilings both higher and lower than this peak.

The effect itself was named in a 2007 paper by Joan Meyers-Levy and Rui Zhu in the Journal of Consumer Research. In three experiments, participants in rooms with ten-foot ceilings engaged more in relational, abstract processing, while those in rooms with eight-foot ceilings favored item-specific, concrete processing. Meyers-Levy and Zhu explained this through priming: a noticeably high ceiling activates concepts of freedom, while a noticeably low one activates concepts of confinement.

== Research ==
Using functional magnetic resonance imaging (fMRI), Oshin Vartanian and colleagues examined in 2015 how ceiling height and perceived enclosure affect responses to architectural spaces. Rooms with high ceilings were judged more beautiful and were more likely to be approached. High ceilings activated the precuneus, which is involved in visuospatial exploration, and the left middle frontal gyrus, but not reward-related areas. Vartanian's group took this to mean the effect works through spatial attention rather than an emotional reward response. A broader review by Alex Coburn, Vartanian, and others in 2020 found that ceiling height affects cognitive, emotional, and behavioral responses to architecture.

The effect does not require a physical room. Zhihui Zhang and colleagues used editable 360-degree virtual reality panoramic scenes of art galleries in 2024 and found that ceiling height influenced specific emotions such as disgust and joy even in simulated settings.

The preference for high ceilings may have an evolutionary basis. The geographer Jay Appleton argued in 1975 that humans prefer environments offering open views ("prospect") together with sheltered spaces ("refuge"). A high ceiling, in this reading, satisfies the prospect side.

Other variables interact with perceived ceiling height. Daniel Oberfeld and colleagues showed in 2010 that lighter ceiling surfaces make a room appear taller. Ji Young Park and Hyun Jung Kim found in 2025 that ceiling height in classrooms interacts with wall color to affect neurophysiological arousal and psychological comfort.

== Applications ==
Workspace designers have used the effect to argue for higher ceilings in brainstorming rooms and lower ceilings in spaces for analytical work such as accounting or proofreading.The original Meyers-Levy and Zhu experiments also suggested that high ceilings lead shoppers to evaluate products more broadly rather than by individual attributes, which has implications for retail store design.

== See also ==
- Environmental psychology
- Proxemics
- Priming (psychology)
- Prospect-refuge theory
- Neuroaesthetics
