= Jiang Bin =

Jiang Bin is the name of:

- Jiang Bin (Ming dynasty) (died 1521), Chinese general and political figure under the Zhengde Emperor
- Jiang Bin (entrepreneur) (born 1966), Chinese billionaire entrepreneur who co-founded GoerTek
- Bin Jiang, Chinese-born geographer and researcher at the University of Gävle, Sweden

== See also ==
- Jiangbin Subdistrict, Mudanjiang, Heilongjiang, China
