= Isovist =

Volume of space visible from a given point

The pale blue area is the point isovist that can be seen from the centre of the circle.

In geometry, an isovist is the volume of space visible from a given point in space, together with a specification of the location of that point. It is a geometric concept coined by Clifford Tandy in 1967 and further refined by the architect Michael Benedikt.

Isovists are naturally three-dimensional, but they may also be studied in two dimensions: either in horizontal section ("plan") or in other vertical sections through the three-dimensional isovist. Every point in physical space has an isovist associated with it.

== Concept ==
The isovist is one of the two representations of the structure of space, along with the spatial-envelope representation. It is an approach in describing space from the point of view of a person within an environment. It refers to the drawn polygon that covers an area that can be seen or reached when he walks in a straight line from a particular position.

The boundary-shape of an isovist may or may not vary with location in, say, a room. If the room is convex (for example, a rectangle or circle), then the boundary-shape of every isovist in that room is the same; and so is its volume (or area, if we are thinking in plan). But the location of the viewpoint relative to the boundary would or could be different. However, if the room were non-convex (for example, an L-shaped or partitioned room), then there would be many isovists whose volume (area) would be less than that of the whole room, and perhaps some that were the whole room; and many would have different, perhaps unique shapes: large and small, narrow and wide, centric and eccentric, whole and shredded.

One can also think of the isovist as the volume of space illuminated by a point source of light. It can also be viewed in the 3D digital environment as the area not in the shadow cast by a single point light source.

It is used in the field of architecture for analysis of buildings and urban areas, typically as one of a series of methods used in space syntax.

== Isovist fields ==
An isovist field is the most common synonymous concept linked to an isovist as it encapsulates a mapping of spatio-visual properties often used for analysing buildings or built spaces and was first proposed by L S Davis and M L Benedikt in 1979. The varied shapes and sizes of isovists often have proposed numerical measures to quantify these. These measures create a set of isovist fields which belong to a given path through a given environment (Benedikt, 1979). When applied to a building, the rigorous mapping of a complete set of spatio-visual properties produces an isovist field. Every environment generates isovist fields which are unique to that environment and the isovist field is often useful when analysing a building in its entirety (Dawes and Ostwald, 2018). Obstacles may be in the way when creating the optimal isovist as the optimal viewshed of an individual from any given location (Emo, 2018). Many approaches have been taken to understand how isovists relate to each other and deliberation on overlapping isovists as the properties of isovist fields (Emo, 2018).

== Visibility graphs ==
Isovist fields have been used to generate visibility graphs which illustrate the spatial environment into a data format (Franz and Wiener, 2005). They can be analysed to compute the intervisibility of positions in a whole environment (Turner et al., 2001) and have become useful in industry when creating floor plans for certain spaces or determining experience of architecture (Franz and Wiener, 2005). When applied to such architecture, isovists and visibility graph measurands are further analysed to predict spatial behaviour of the individual (Franz and Wiener, 2005).

== Origins ==
Isovists and similar spatial techniques have become encouraging methods of generally describing properties of architectural space (Franz and Wiener, 2005). Benedikt (1979) originally proposed isovists to be an objectively basic element which captures spatial properties by describing the visible area from a single observation point (Franz and Wiener, 2005). Isovists describe spatial properties from a beholder-centered perspective (Franz and Wiener, 2005). From early research it was found that the isovist properties can be used to generate a more comprehensive or "global" mapping of a space.

=== James Gibson ===
Environmental psychologist James Gibson (1966) was a pioneer in the concept of examining the relationship between a viewer and their environment when developing his first model of the geometry of visual perception (Dawes and Ostwald, 2018). Gibson proposed three key characteristics which influence this relationship; the first being "ambient" to describe how any individual's understanding of an environment is restricted, the second being "optic" as the realisation environmental information is a constituent of vision, and the third being "array" as the ordered arrangement of elements as part of a larger system (Dawes and Ostwald, 2018). Gibson identified a ray of light as a geometrically structures source of information (Dawes and Ostwald, 2018) and as such, assisted in forming the foundations of visual perception concepts.

=== Michael Benedikt ===
Urbanist Michael Benedikt's paper ‘To take hold of space: isovists and isovist fields’ published in 1979 defined the isovist as “the set of all points visible from a single vantage point in space with respect to an environment" (Benedikt, 1979). Benedikt was influenced greatly by the ideas that were proposed by Gibson, allowing him to push theoretical boundaries to pave the way for future research (Emo, 2018). As the first official definition of the isovist, Benedikt pioneered the conversation of isovists and their subsequent analysis over the years to understand the role they have in the interplay between human vision and behaviour (Sengke and Atmodiwirjo, 2017). From this, the definition of the isovist evolved further, being described as a "viewshed or an area in spatial environment directly visible from a location within the space" (Turner, 2001), then as "the space that can be seen from any vantage point" (Batty, 2001).

== Implementation ==
=== Architecture ===
In architecture, an isovist is largely represented as a polygon traced on a floor plan when represented in two dimensions (Ostwald, Dawes 2018) and used to analyse architectural and urban spaces. The concept of an isovist has more frequently been used to analyse the experience of buildings and the properties of certain architectural works (Dawes and Ostwald, 2018). An experiment conducted by Franz, von der Heyde, & Bülthoff (2005), applied isovist analysis in an architectural psychology context to predict experimental qualities of architecture from its spatial properties. The experiment concluded that isovists alongside visibility graph measurands which capture spatial properties affect the architecture experience. Further research has also determined that the largest and smallest isovist areas in a given space have been found to be directly correlated to an individual's perception of the most exposed and most visible sections of a building.

=== Frank Lloyd Wright's Guggenheim Museum ===
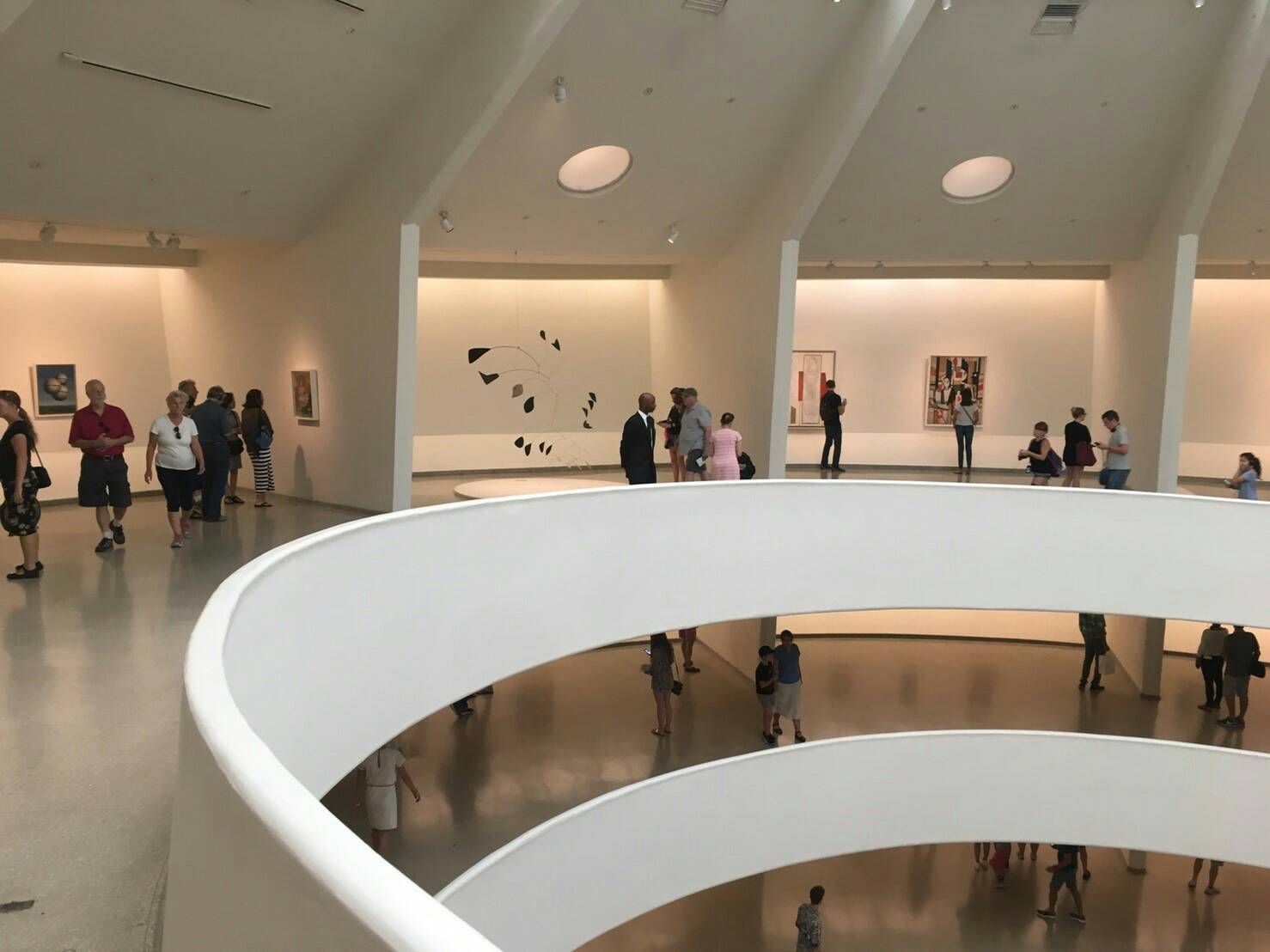
Interior view of the Guggenheim Museum

In relation to the Guggenheim Museum, the shape and size of the isovist remains almost identical as an individual makes their way around the museum's ramp (Benedikt, 1979). The architect Frank Lloyd Wright stated, "no meeting of the eye with abrupt changes of form … the new painting will be seen for itself" (Wright, 1960), where this work of architecture was designed for the individual to engage with the art instead of the visitor's spatial variety. In this building, the isovist is constructed cyclically allowing the visitor to remain more actively engaged in each individual piece of art, creating spatial variety (Benedikt, 1979). Wright himself described this effect, "in the harmonious fluid quiet … of the unbroken wave … no meeting of the eye with abrupt changes of form … the new painting will be seen for itself", (Wright, 1960).

=== Urban areas ===
In the context of urban areas and built environments, isovists are useful in analysing street life, safety and economical attractiveness (Van Nes, 2011). The location of important urban artefacts such as towers and lighthouses need to consider their panoptical view, how the isovists’ view subsequently increases or decreases. This panoptical view is defined by walls, buildings, moving objects, and free-standing objects such as trees, bushes and statues, where the isovist's shape and size changes as one moves about the environment (Van Nes, 2011). As such, isovist analyses have been proven useful in urban planning and strategic design of built environments to determine human behaviour in certain environments based on spatial perception.

Isovist as variables in an experiment conducted by Gerg Weitkamp, Ron van Lammeren, and Arnold Bregt concluded a strong correlation was found between the isovist variables and their perceived equivalents in an open field. Landscape openness was outlined as "the amount of space perceivable to the viewer" (Kaplan, Kaplan, and Brown, 1989), a concept which can be manipulated by isovist variables which have been proven as good indicators for perceived landscape openness (Weitkamp, van Lammeren, and Bregt, 2014).

=== Human behaviour and perception ===
Isovists and isovist fields have been used in assessing social and cognitive properties of architectural plans. An isovist accommodates all light rays visible to the human eye from any direction. They cover some subsets of sources of visual information for the individual which can be used to investigate or even predict human behavioural and cognitive responses to buildings (Dawes and Ostwald, 2013). From a fixed location, an isovist is delineated by every space visible in all directions and can reflect capacities and behaviours of people in space.

Visual experience of a human has been described as "seeing as experiencing" (Trevelyan, 1977) whereby the mind and body is influenced by its surrounding environment to impact human wellbeing as a whole (Sengke and Atmodiwirjo, 2017). Therefore, isovists have proven useful in certain applications of architecture. In the mechanism of seeing, isovist analysis can be conducted to determine the visual angle at which the human field of view is included (Sengke and Atmodiwirjo, 2017). Human behaviour and perception as such is stimulated by one's environment which is perceived through the "reflection of light on the surface that humans can respond … [where] in this process, the transactions happens through information provision and information reception" (Sengke and Atmodiwirjo, 2017).

=== In hospitals ===
In the physical environment of hospital inpatient wards, the physical qualities of the environment can influence the healing process of the patient (Sengke and Atmodiwirjo, 2017). Isovist analysis can be used to represent this experience of a patient by simulating the hospital ward environment to imitate the elements which can or cannot be seen by the patient as the view of the patient can affect their health condition (Sengke and Atmodiwirjo, 2017). Elements of a patient's view in hospital, such as having "contact with nature, finishes that provide a variety of colours and texture, art to provide simulation and distraction, and interior appearance design to inspire confidence and positive atmosphere" (Sengke and Atmodiwirjo, 2017), can collectively influence their experience and hence healing process in a hospital ward.

== Criticism ==
=== Prospect-refuge theory ===
In 1975 Jay Appleton notoriously questioned environmental preference and proposed the prospect-refuge theory, a notion which employs the isovist to demonstrate how certain environments and an individual's visibility in such environment impacts emotional responses including fear and happiness. This theory analyses landscapes and their strategic evaluation as potential habitats, where the "prospect" component refers to the opportunity to see while the "refuge" refers to the opportunity to hide. When these two elements are combined, this theory allows a deeper understanding of environments and has been slowly accepted into environmental preference research (Dawes and Ostwald, 2013). Prospect and refuge can be measured individually or in combination to examine their relative sensitivities or robustness and later be applied to more complex architectures (Dawes and Ostwald, 2013).

=== Privacy issues ===
Isovists have the capacity to skew the optimal surveillance path of an individual and their perception of a particular environment. This concept impacts privacy issues when used to analyse the role of perception on crime. A report on crime in and around urban residential areas by Newman (1973, pages 30–34) demonstrated the significance of the relationship between visibility and crime. It was found the intending criminal is concerned with one's spatial characteristics, in particular the inconspicuousness of the target and their concealment from detection, attributes which are both impacted by the isovist. The isovist has therefore been found utilitarian to optimise space for a range of purposes (Desyllas, 2000; Hillier and Shu, 2000) when considering crime, spatial occupation, and rental returns.

== See also ==
- Art gallery theorem
- Viewshed
- Visibility (geometry)
- Visibility polygon
