= Visibility graph analysis =

In architecture, visibility graph analysis (VGA) is a method of analysing the inter-visibility connections within buildings or urban networks. Visibility graph analysis was developed from the architectural theory of space syntax by Turner et al. (2001), and is applied through the construction of a visibility graph within the open space of a plan.

Visibility graph analysis uses various measures from the theory of small-world networks and centrality in network theory in order to assess perceptual qualities of space and the possible usage of it.

Visibility graph analysis was firstly implemented in Turner's Depthmap software and is now widely used by both academics and practitioners through the open source and multi-platform depthmapX developed by Tasos Varoudis.

Another open-source and multi-platform software that implements visibility graphs is topologicpy developed by Wassim Jabi.

== See also ==
- Fuzzy architectural spatial analysis
- Isovist
- Spatial network analysis software
- Viewshed analysis
