= Joseph O'Rourke (professor) =

American computer scientist

Joseph O'Rourke is the Spencer T. and Ann W. Olin Professor of Computer Science at Smith College and the founding chair of the Smith computer science department. His main research interest is computational geometry. He is the author of multiple books on computational geometry, the mathematics of paper folding, and geometric visibility.

One of O'Rourke's early results was an algorithm for finding the minimum bounding box of a point set in three dimensions when the box is not required to be axis-aligned. The problem is made difficult by the fact that the optimal box may not share any of its face planes with the convex hull of the point set. Nevertheless, O'Rourke found an algorithm for this problem with running time $O(n^3)$.

In 1985, O'Rourke was both the local arrangements chair and the program chair of the first annual Symposium on Computational Geometry. He was formerly the arXiv moderator for computational geometry and discrete mathematics.

In 2012 O'Rourke was named a Fellow of the Association for Computing Machinery.

== Works ==
- Art Gallery Theorems and Algorithms (1987). ISBN 978-0-19-503965-8 PDF of book:
- Computational Geometry in C, 2nd Ed. (1998). ISBN 978-0-521-64976-6
- Handbook of Discrete and Computational Geometry, with Jacob E. Goodman and Csaba Tóth. 3rd Ed. (2017). ISBN 978-1-49871-139-5
- Geometric Folding Algorithms: Linkages, Origami, Polyhedra, with Erik D. Demaine (2007). ISBN 978-0-521-85757-4
- Discrete and Computational Geometry, with Satyan Devadoss (1st ed 2011, 2nd ed 2025). ISBN 978-0-691-26620-6.
- How To Fold It: The Mathematics of Linkages, Origami, and Polyhedra (2011). ISBN 978-0-521-14547-3.
- Pop-Up Geometry: The Mathematics behind Pop-Up Cards (2022). ISBN 9781009115476.
- Reshaping Convex Polyhedra, with Costin Vîlcu. Springer-Verlag. March, 2024. ISBN 978-3-031-47510-8.
- The Mathematics of Origami. Cambridge University Press, published December, 2025. ISBN 978-1-009-68735-5. 194+xii pages. 166 figures. Author animations. Cambridge link.
- Art Gallery Visibility Theorems: An Introduction. Cambridge University Press, Mar 2027. ISBN 978-1-047-76969-3 Link.
