= Space syntax =

Theories in architecture and urban planning

Map of axial lines in Brasília. The colours show the global integration of the different streets, measuring the accessibility of a topological line for the entire system according to the spatial analysis of the space syntax. Created with Mindwalk 1.0

Space syntax is a set of theories and techniques for the analysis of spatial configurations. It was conceived by Bill Hillier, Julienne Hanson, and colleagues at The Bartlett, University College London in the late 1970s to early 1980s to develop insights into the mutually constructive relation between society and space. As space syntax has evolved, certain measures have been found to correlate with human spatial behaviour, and space syntax has thus come to be used to forecast likely effects of architectural and urban space on users.

== Thesis ==
The general idea is that spaces can be broken down into components, analysed as networks of choices, then represented as maps and graphs that describe the relative connectivity and integration of those spaces. It rests on three basic conceptions of space:

- an isovist (popularised by Michael Benedikt at University of Texas), or viewshed or visibility polygon, the field of view from any particular point
- axial space (idea popularised by Bill Hillier at UCL), a straight sight-line and possible path
- convex space (popularised by John Peponis, and his collaborators at Georgia Tech), an occupiable void where, if imagined as a wireframe diagram, no line between two of its points goes outside its perimeter: all points within the polygon are visible to all other points within the polygon.

The three most popular ways of analysing a street network are integration, choice and depth distance.

=== Integration ===
Integration measures the amount of street-to-street transitions needed from a street segment, to reach all other street segments in the network, using shortest paths. The graph analysis could also limit measure integration at radius 'n', for segments further than this radius not to be taken into account. The first intersecting segment requires only one transition, the second two transitions and so on. The result of the analysis finds street segments that require fewest turns to reach all other streets, which are called 'most integrated' and are usually represented with hotter colours, such as red or yellow. Integration can also be analysed in local scale instead of the scale of the whole network. In the case of radius 4, for instance, only four turns are counted departing from each street segment. Measure also is highly related to network analysis Centrality.

Theoretically, the integration measure shows the cognitive complexity of reaching a street, and is often argued to 'predict' the pedestrian use of a street: the easier it is to reach a street, the more popular it should be.

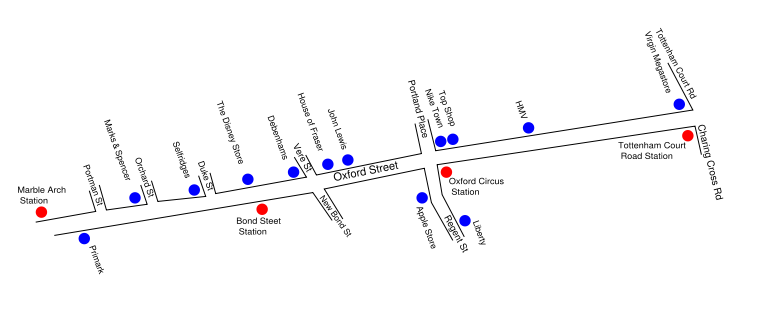
Major shops and London Underground stations on Oxford Street, in 2006

While there is some evidence of this being true, the method is biased towards long, straight streets that intersect with many other streets. Such streets, as Oxford Street in London, come out as especially strongly integrated. However, a slightly curvy street of the same length would typically be segmented into individual straight segments, not counted as a single line, which makes curvy streets appear less integrated in the analysis.

=== Choice ===
The choice measure is easiest to understand as a 'water-flow' in the street network. Imagine that each street segment is given an initial load of one unit of water, which then starts pouring from the starting street segment to all segments that successively connect to it. Each time an intersection appears, the remaining value of flow is divided equally among the splitting streets, until all the other street segments in the graph are reached. For instance, at the first intersection with a single other street, the initial value of one is split into two remaining values of one half, and allocated to the two intersecting street segments. Moving further down, the remaining one half value is again split among the intersecting streets and so on. When the same procedure has been conducted using each segment as a starting point for the initial value of one, a graph of final values appears. The streets with the highest total values of accumulated flow are said to have the highest choice values.

Like integration, choice analysis can be restricted to limited local radii, for instance 400m, 800m, 1600m. Interpreting choice analysis is trickier than integration. Space syntax argues that these values often predict the car traffic flow of streets, but, strictly speaking, choice analysis can also be thought to represent the number of intersections that need to be crossed to reach a street. However, since flow values are divided (not subtracted) at each intersection, the output shows an exponential distribution. It is considered best to take a log of base two of the final values in order to get a more accurate picture.

=== Depth distance ===
Depth distance is the most intuitive of the analysis methods. It explains the linear distance from the center point of each street segment to the center points of all the other segments. If every segment is successively chosen as a starting point, a graph of cumulative final values is achieved. The streets with lowest Depth Distance values are said to be nearest to all the other streets. Again, the search radius can be limited to any distance.

== Applications ==
From these components it is thought to be possible to quantify and describe how easily navigable any space is, useful for the design of museums, airports, hospitals, and other settings where wayfinding is a significant issue. Space syntax has also been applied to predict the correlation between spatial layouts and social effects such as crime, traffic flow, and sales per unit area.

In general, the analysis uses one of many software programs that allow researchers to analyse graphs of one (or more) of the primary spatial components.

== History ==
Space syntax originated as a programme research in the early 1970s when Bill Hillier, Adrian Leaman and Alan Beattie came together at the School of Environmental Studies at University College London (now part of the Bartlett School of Architecture). Bill Hillier had been appointed Director of the Unit for Architectural Studies (UAS) as successor to John Musgrove. They established a new MSc programme in Advanced Architectural Studies and embarked on a programme of research aimed at developing a theoretical basis for architecture. Previously Bill Hillier had written papers with others as secretary to the RIBA, notably 'Knowledge and Design' and 'How is Design Possible'. These laid the theoretical foundation for a series of studies that sought to clarify how the built environment relates to society. One of the first cohorts of students on the MScAAS was Julienne Hanson who went on to co-author The Social Logic of Space (SLS) with Bill Hillier (CUP, 1984). This brought together in one place a comprehensive review of the programme of research up to that point, but also developed a full theoretical account for how the buildings and settlements we construct an not merely the product of social processes, but also play a role in producing social forms. SLS also developed an analytic approach to representation and quantification of spatial configuration at the building and the settlement scale, making possible both comparative studies as well as analysis of the relationship between spatial configuration and aspect of social function in the built environment. These methods coupled to the social theories have turned out to have a good deal of explanatory power. Space syntax has grown to become a tool used around the world in a variety of research areas and design applications in architecture, urban design, urban planning, transport and interior design. Many prominent design applications have been made by the architectural and urban planning practice Space Syntax Limited, which was founded at The Bartlett, University College London in 1989. These include the redesign of Trafalgar Square with Foster and Partners and the Pedestrian Movement Model for the City of London.

Over the past decade, Space syntax techniques have been used for research in archaeology, information technology, urban and human geography, and anthropology. Since 1997, the Space syntax community has held biennial conferences, and many journal papers have been published on the subject, chiefly in Environment and Planning B.

== Criticism ==
Space syntax's mathematical reliability has come under scrutiny because of a seeming paradox that arises under certain geometric configurations with 'axial maps', one of the method's primary representations of spatial configuration. This paradox was proposed by Carlo Ratti at the Massachusetts Institute of Technology, but comprehensively refuted in a passionate academic exchange with Bill Hillier and Alan Penn. There have been moves to combine space syntax with more traditional transport engineering models, using intersections as nodes and constructing visibility graphs to link them, by researchers including Bin Jiang, Valerio Cutini and Michael Batty. Recently there has also been research development that combines space syntax with geographic accessibility analysis in GIS, such as the place syntax-models developed by the research group Spatial Analysis and Design at the Royal Institute of Technology in Stockholm, Sweden. A series of interdisciplinary works published in 2006 by Vito Latora, Sergio Porta and colleagues, proposing a network approach to street centrality analysis and design, have highlighted space syntax' contribution to decades of previous studies in the physics of spatial complex networks.

== See also ==
- Permeability (spatial and transport planning)
- Spatial network
- Spatial network analysis software
- Visibility graph analysis
- Fuzzy architectural spatial analysis
