= Community separator =

In urban planning in the United States, a community separator (or simply a separator) is a parcel of undeveloped land, sometimes in the form of open space, separating two or more urban areas under different municipal jurisdictions which has been designated to provide a permanent low-density area preserving the communal integrity of the two municipalities. Separators are typically created by one or more municipalities in situations of rapid urban growth, where unchecked development might otherwise result in the contiguity of the urban areas. A unilateral separator that partially or completely encircles a municipality is commonly known as a greenbelt.

Separators often consist of undeveloped farmland, forests, floodplains, or other areas that may or may not be desirable for residential or commercial development. The enactment of a separator is commonly achieved through a variety of different means, including conservation easements, outright purchase of land for parks, or zoning restrictions. Separators are often enacted along major highways connecting municipalities in order to preserve the open viewshed that provides a natural boundary between two communities.

Separators are sometimes controversial since they can withdraw desirable development land from the marketplace, resulting not only in the loss of tax revenue but also incurring the cost of acquiring and managing the land.
