= Ruth Conroy Dalton =

British architect and author

- Born: Ruth Alison Conroy; 2 January 1971 (age 55)
- Occupation: Architect
- Spouse: Nick Dalton
- Children: 2

Ruth Conroy Dalton is a British architect, author and Professor of Architecture at Northumbria University. She has authored or contributed to more than 200 publications. She is an expert in space syntax analysis, pedestrian movement and wayfinding and a world-leading authority on the overlap between architecture and spatial cognition (architectural cognition).

She is known for her work on using virtual reality to research wayfinding behaviours; her theories on how people try to limit their cumulative angular deviation when wayfinding; applying angular weightings to standard space syntax axial analysis (with Nick Dalton and Alasdair Turner); adding depth decay functions to network graphs (also with Nick Dalton); using small graph matching techniques to research building typology and, most recently, her work on social wayfinding.

== Early life ==
She attended Ackworth School, West Yorkshire. She received her Bachelor of Architecture from the Bartlett School of Architecture, University College London in 1991, Masters in Advanced Architectural Studies in 1996, and qualified as a licensed architect in 2000 before earning a PhD in Architecture in 2001, also from the Bartlett, UCL. Her PhD provided the first evidence that there were statistically significant similarities between patterns of navigation and movement in the real world and in virtual reality. This was significant because it meant that wayfinding experiments conducted in virtual simulations could be predictive of real-world patterns of pedestrian movement.

== Career ==
As a licensed architect, she has worked for Foster and Partners (1991–1994) and Sheppard Robson (1994–95) and key projects upon which she has worked include the Carré d'Art de Nîmes, in France, the Palacio de Congresos de Valencia, Spain, and the London King's Cross railway station International Terminal (unbuilt). She taught at the Architectural Association School of Architecture in London before taking up permanent academic appointments at the Georgia Institute of Technology (2001–2004), the Bartlett School of Architecture, University College London (2004–2010), and Northumbria University (2010–2019), where she was Head of Department for the Architecture and Built Environment Department, the first woman to hold the post, as well as Founding member & Inaugural Chair of Northumbria University's newly formed Professoriate. In 2019 she became the Inaugural/Founding Professor of Architecture and Head of the Lancaster School of Architecture in the Lancaster Institute for the Contemporary Arts at Lancaster University, before returning to Northumbria University in 2022.

In 2016, she was part of the team of scientists, neuroscientists and experts in dementia behind the crowdsourced navigation game/app Sea Hero Quest, played by ~4.3M people. Her role on the team was working with Glitchers to design the game levels at varying degrees of spatial complexity and navigational difficulty (due to her background in researching the relationship between spatial complexity and wayfinding performance).

== Selected works ==
=== Books ===
- Dalton, Ruth Conroy; Hölscher, Christoph (2016). Take One Building: Interdisciplinary Research Perspectives of the Seattle Central Library. Routledge. ISBN 9781138616585.
- Dalton, Ruth (2017). Designing for Heritage: Contemporary Visitor Centres. Lund Humphries. ISBN 978-1-84822-214-4.
- Dalton, Ruth (2022). Living in Houses: A Personal History of English Domestic Architecture. Lund Humphries. ISBN 9781848224957.
- Moreno-Rangel, Alejandro; Dalton, Ruth Conroy (2023). Future Home: Trends, Innovations and Disruptors in Housing Design. Routledge. ISBN 9781032414676.

=== Selected papers ===
- Coutrot, Antoine; Manley, Ed; Goodroe, Sara; Gahnstrom, Christoffer; Filomena, Gabriele; Yesiltepe, Demet; Dalton, Ruth C.; Wiener, Jan M.; Hölscher, Christoph; Hornberger, Michael; Spiers, Hugo J. (March 2022). "Entropy of city street networks linked to future spatial navigation ability". Nature. doi: 10.1038/s41586-022-04486-7
- Kuliga, Saskia F.; Nelligan, Benjamin; Dalton, Ruth C.; Marchette, Steven; Shelton, Amy L.; Carlson, Laura; Hölscher, Christoph (June 2019). "Exploring Individual Differences and Building Complexity in Wayfinding: The Case of the Seattle Central Library" (PDF). Environment and Behavior. 51 (5): 622–665. Bibcode:2019EnvBe..51..622K. doi:10.1177/0013916519836149. S2CID 150719300.
- Dalton, Ruth C.; Hölscher, Christoph; Montello, Daniel R. (4 February 2019). "Wayfinding as a Social Activity". Frontiers in Psychology. 10: 142. doi:10.3389/fpsyg.2019.00142. PMC 6369211. PMID 30778315.
- Coutrot, Antoine; Silva, Ricardo; Manley, Ed; de Cothi, Will; Sami, Saber; Bohbot, Véronique D.; Wiener, Jan M.; Hölscher, Christoph; Dalton, Ruth C.; Hornberger, Michael; Spiers, Hugo J. (September 2018). "Global Determinants of Navigation Ability". Current Biology. 28 (17): 2861–2866.e4. Bibcode:2018CBio...28E2861C. doi:10.1016/j.cub.2018.06.009. PMID 30100340.
- Dalton, Ruth Conroy; Kuliga, Saskia Felizitas; Hölscher, Christoph (July 2013). "POE 2.0: exploring the potential of social media for capturing unsolicited post-occupancy evaluations". Intelligent Buildings International. 5 (3): 162–180. doi:10.1080/17508975.2013.800813. S2CID 109277234.
- Carlson, Laura A.; Hölscher, Christoph; Shipley, Thomas F.; Dalton, Ruth Conroy (October 2010). "Getting Lost in Buildings". Current Directions in Psychological Science. 19 (5): 284–289. doi:10.1177/0963721410383243. S2CID 146650263.
- Conroy Dalton, Ruth; Kirsan, Ciler (2008). "Small-graph matching and building genotypes". Environment and Planning B: Planning and Design. 35 (5): 810–830. Bibcode:2008EnPlB..35..810C. doi:10.1068/b31136. S2CID 14827268.
- Dalton, Ruth Conroy (January 2003). "The Secret Is To Follow Your Nose". Environment and Behavior. 35 (1): 107–131. Bibcode:2003EnvBe..35..107D. doi:10.1177/0013916502238867. S2CID 12345434.
