= Computer Applications and Quantitative Methods in Archaeology =

International organization

- Abbreviation: CAA
- Discipline: Archaeology, Geographic information system, Computer Science

Publication details
- Publisher: CAA International
- History: 1973-present
- Frequency: Annual
- Website: CAA International

Computer Applications and Quantitative Methods in Archaeology (CAA) is a global organization bringing together archaeologists, mathematicians and computer scientists. Its aims are to encourage communication between these disciplines, to provide a survey of present work in the field, and to stimulate discussion and future progress. CAA International has been organizing the annual meetings of its members since the 1970s. It has grown into a large community of more than 1000 scholars from around the world. Its members created a dozen of National CAA chapters and special interest groups. CAA International publishes annual proceedings and the Journal of Computer Applications in Archaeology (JCAA).

== History of CAA International ==
Computer Applications and Quantitative Methods in Archaeology (CAA) has been created in the 1970s. Initially, it was a small group of archaeologists and mathematicians interested in computer applications and working in the United Kingdom (UK). The first conference was organized in 1973 in Birmingham, England. In 1992 the first, CAA conference was held outside the UK. Gradually, the CAA has grown into a large international community.

Over the years national chapters have been established. Some having their own workshops series. One of the oldest chapters is in Germany founded in 1981. CAA Germany has annual meetings since 2010 including joint chapter meetings with Netherlands and Flanders. Germany also hosted the international conference in 2018.

== Journal of Computer Applications in Archaeology ==
The Journal of Computer Applications in Archaeology is the peer-reviewed and open-access academic journal published by CAA. It was established in 2017 and is published online as a continuous volume and issue throughout the year. The current managing editors are Cesar Gonzalez-Perez and Philip Verhagen.

The journal publishes special collections with thematic or regional focus. Past collections include:

- Computer applications and quantitative methods in Australasian archaeology
- Spatial Computation in Archaeology and History
- Fighting illicit trade in antiquities with digital technology
- Reflections on Archaeological Lidar
- Digital Scholarship in Archaeology
- A Bridge too Far - Historical, Archaeological and Criminal Network Research

== National Chapters ==
Over the years national and regional chapters have been established. Some having their own workshops series. One of the oldest chapters is in Germany founded in 1981. CAA Germany has annual meetings since 2010 including joint chapter meetings with Netherlands and Flanders.

Current active national and regional chapters are:

- CAA Australasia (Australia, New Zealand and the Pacific)
- CAA Brazil
- CAA Czechia/Slovakia
- CAA Denmark
- CAA France
- CAA Germany
- CAA Greece
- CAA Hungary
- CAA India
- CAA Netherlands-Flanders
- CAA Mexico
- CAA North America (USA and Canada)
- CAA Norway
- CAA Poland
- CAA Sweden
- CAA Switzerland
- CAA United Kingdom

== Current CAA International conference ==
The current 53rd CAA International conference is CAA 2026 Vienna 'It's All About People' - 31 March - 4 April

== Previous conferences ==
- The 52nd - CAA 2025: Athens 'Digital Horizons: Embracing Heritage in an Evolving World']
- The 51st - CAA 2024: 'Across The Horizon', Auckland, New Zealand
- The 50th - CAA 2023: '50 years of synergy', Amsterdam, Netherland
- The 49th - CAA 2022: ‘iNside Formation’, Oxford, United Kingdom
- The 48th - CAA 2021: ‘Digital Crossroads’, Virtual Conference from Limassol, Cyprus
- ~~The 48th - CAA 2020: Oxford, UK~~ (Postponed to 2022 due to COVID-19 pandemic)
- The 47th - CAA 2019: ‘Check Object Integrity’, Kraków, Poland
- The 46th - CAA 2018: ‘Human History and Digital Future’, Tübingen, Germany
- The 45th - CAA 2017: ‘Digital Archaeologies, Material Worlds (Past and Present)’, Atlanta, Georgia, United States
- The 44th - CAA 2016: ‘Exploring Oceans of Data’, Oslo, Norway
- The 43rd - CAA 2015: ‘Keep the Revolution Going’, Siena, Italy
- The 42nd - CAA 2014: '21st Century Archaeology', Paris, France
- The 41st - CAA 2013: 'Across Space and Time', Perth, Australia
- The 40th - CAA 2012: Southampton, United Kingdom

== Next conference ==
- The 52st - CAA 2025: Athens, Greece
