= Visibility (geometry) =

Mathematical abstraction of objects being "visible"

In geometry, visibility is a mathematical abstraction of the real-life notion of visibility.

Given a set of obstacles in the Euclidean space, two points in the space are said to be visible to each other, if the line segment that joins them does not intersect any obstacles. (In the Earth's atmosphere light follows a slightly curved path that is not perfectly predictable, complicating the calculation of actual visibility.)

Computation of visibility is among the basic problems in computational geometry and has applications in computer graphics, motion planning, and other areas.

== Concepts and problems ==
- Point visibility
- Edge visibility
- Visibility polygon
- Weak visibility
- Art gallery problem or museum problem
- Visibility graph
  - Visibility graph of vertical line segments
- Watchman route problem
- Computer graphics applications:
  - Hidden-surface determination
  - Hidden-line removal
  - z-buffering
  - portal engine
- Star-shaped polygon
  - Kernel of a polygon
- Isovist
- Viewshed
- Zone of Visual Influence
- Painter's algorithm
