= Bin Jiang =

Geoinformatics researcher

Bin Jiang is a professor in geographic information science, geographic information systems or geoinformatics at the University of Gävle, Sweden. He is affiliated to the Royal Institute of Technology Stockholm (KTH) through the KTH Research School at Gävle. He has been coordinating the Nordic Network in Geographic Information Science (NordGISci), and has organized a series of NordGISci summer schools for the Nordic young researchers. He is the founder and chair of the International Cartographic Association Commission on Geospatial Analysis and Modeling, and has established an ICA workshop series on the research topic. He is also an associate editor of the international journal: Computers, Environment and Urban Systems (Elsevier). He has developed the Head/tail Breaks a new classification for data with a heavy-tailed distribution.

== Education ==
Jiang obtained his bachelor's and master's degrees respectively from Wuhan University, formerly Wuhan Technical University of Surveying and Mapping, and Chinese Academy of Surveying and Mapping, Beijing, China. He took Doctorate in 1996 at the University of Utrecht and International Institute for Geo-Information Science and Earth Observation (ITC), the Netherlands.

== Work in space syntax ==
Jiang joined the Centre for Advanced Spatial Analysis (CASA), University College London as a senior research fellow in 1997, where he worked with Michael Batty for integrating space syntax into GIS. He developed Axwoman a plugin to ArcView GIS for urban morphological analysis (latest version 6.0 is based on ArcGIS). He proposed point-based space syntax, which is implemented in Axwoman 5.0. He proved that streets (either named streets or natural streets) are better than axial lines for predicating traffic flow and weighted PageRank is better indicator for traffic flow than local integration. Recently he has with his assistant developed AxialGen 1.0 for automating the axial lines for space syntax analysis.

== Work in living structure ==
His recent research effort is to build up a bridge between fractal geometry (established by Benoit Mandelbrot 1924–2010) and living geometry developed by Christopher Alexander, to measure the livingness of modern cities and better plan sustainable or livable cities. In this connection, his major contributions may be summarized as follows:

(1) Scaling law and the third definition of fractal

According to the first law of geography, things are more or less similar locally, and this is also called spatial dependence or homogeneity. However, there are far more small things than large ones globally or across different scales ranging from the smallest to the largest, so called spatial heterogeneity. He formulated scaling law out of the notion (or the recurring notion) of far more smalls than larges and invented the head/tail breaks to characterize the spatial heterogeneity. Based on the scaling law, he re-defined fractal as a set or pattern in which the notion of far more smalls than larges recurs at least twice.

(2) Living structure of cities implemented in Axwoman a spatial analysis module.

The British mathematician and philosopher Alfred North Whitehead (1861–1947) first conceived the organismic worldview under which human beings and the material world are unified rather than separated from each other. The organismic worldview differs fundamentally from the Cartesian mechanistic worldview under which two views of space have been inherited from the past three hundred years of science: Newtonian absolute space and Leibnizian relational space. Inspired by the organismic worldview, the great architect Christopher Alexander proposed the third view of space: space is neither lifeless nor neutral but a living structure capable of being more living or less living, and further developed the theory of living structure for characterizing livingness of cities.

Living structure is such a mathematical structure in which there are far more small substructures than large ones. Dr. Jiang was among the first who implemented the living structure of cities through his software tool Axwoman. He has since developed the notion of natural cities that can be automatically extracted from open-access big data such as nighttime imagery, location-based social media data, and OpenStreetMap for better measuring the degree of living structure and subsequently planning cities to be more living or more livable.

(3) The mathematical model of living structure

As a scientific maverick, Alexander spent 30 years on his life's work “The Nature of Order”, in which he defined living structure mathematically yet failed to figure out mathematics as he admitted when the four-volume book was published in 2005. Ten years later, Dr. Jiang first developed a mathematical model, also known as beautimeter, which truly reflects Alexander's initial definition. The model can address not only why a space is living but also how living the space is. More importantly, the living structure can be well reflected in human mind and heart, triggering a sense of livingness or beauty.

Before the invention of thermometer, warmness is a kind of subjective feeling, yet after the invention of thermometer, warmness can be objectively measured. Nowadays, livingness or beauty of cities is still considered to be opinions or personal preferences, but in the near future the livingness of cities can be well measured through beautimeter. In other words, the goodness of cities, buildings or streets is no longer subjective opinions but a matter of measurable facts.
