= Michael Benedikt (urbanist) =

American urbanist (1946–2025)

Michael Benedikt (1946 - 2025) was an architect, urbanist, and academic. He is noted for formalizing and promoting the geographical concept called isovist. Benedikt is also an advocate of the interior design concept called "interiorist" practice.

== Biography ==
He received his Bachelor of Architecture from the University of the Witwatersrand (South Africa) in 1971 and his Master of Environmental Design (M.E.D.) from Yale School of Architecture in 1975. In 2003, he was awarded the University of Texas at Austin School of Architecture's Teacher of Year Award, and in 2004 was named a distinguished professor by the Association of Collegiate Schools of Architecture (ACSA). Benedikt became a visiting professor at the University for the Creative Arts in September 2016. He has published over 100 articles and has delivered more than 85 invited lectures in the U.S. and abroad on architectural practice, design theory and research, computing, art, and ethics.

He died at home, surrounded by family, on August 13, 2025 after an illness. He was 78 years old.

== Career ==
Benedikt is a 2004 ACSA distinguished professor at the University of Texas at Austin School of Architecture, where he holds the Hal Box Chair in Urbanism. He directs The Center for American Architecture and Design and the Graduate Program in Interdisciplinary Studies, and is the chair of the Architecture Graduate Studies Committee. His areas of interests are advanced Architectural Design, architectural theory, and graduate design.

== Works ==
In his work as architect and professor of urbanism, Benedikt proposed the adoption of the "interiorist" model. It is a design practice that approaches interior design from a phenomenological position. The concept emphasizes working from inside out, where the feeling of the interior extends out-of-doors. Benedikt also refined the notion of isovist, a geometric concept used in architecture to denote the volume visible from a given location, in a view-independent fashion.

Benedikt's published works include:

- For An Architecture of Reality (Lumen),
- Deconstructing the Kimbell (Lumen),
- Cyberspace: First Steps (ed., MIT Press),
- Shelter: The 2000 Wallenberg Lecture (U. Michigan), and
- God, Creativity and Evolution: The Argument From Design(ers) (Centerline Books)
- God Is the Good We Do (Bottino Books)
- Architecture Beyond Experience (AR+D, 2020)
