= Viewshed analysis =

Viewshed analysis is a computational algorithm that delineates a viewshed, the area that is visible (on the base terrain surface) from a given location. It is a common part of the terrain analysis toolset found in most geographic information system (GIS) software. The analysis uses the elevation value of each cell of the digital elevation model (DEM) to determine visibility to or from a particular cell. The location of this particular cell varies depending on the needs of the analysis. For example, a viewshed analysis is commonly used to locate communication towers or determining the view from a road. Viewsheds can be calculated using an individual point such as a tower or multiple points such as a line representing a road. When analyzing a line segment, each of the vertices along the line is calculated to determine its visible area. The process can also be reversed. For example, when locating a landfill, the analysis can determine from where the landfill is visible to keep it hidden from view.

== Viewshed analysis process ==
A viewshed analysis can be performed using one of many GIS programs, such as ArcGIS Pro, GRASS GIS (r.los, r.viewshed), QGIS (viewshed plugin), LuciadLightspeed, LuciadMobile, SAGA GIS (Visibility), TNT Mips, ArcMap, Maptitude, ERDAS IMAGINE. A viewshed is created from a DEM by using an algorithm that estimates the difference of elevation from one cell (the viewpoint cell) to the next (the target cell). To determine the visibility of a target cell, each cell between the viewpoint cell and target cell is examined for line of sight. Where cells of higher value are between the viewpoint and target cells the line of sight is blocked. If the line of sight is blocked then the target cell is determined to not be part of the viewshed. If it is not blocked then it is included in the viewshed.

The algorithm is also based on a given set of variables. When performing a viewshed analysis, several variables can be used to limit or adjust the calculation. For example, if the analysis is to determine the location of a radio tower, the height of the tower could be added to the elevation of that location (cell value). If no height is given, then the viewshed analysis uses the cell value of the DEM in which the tower is located.

Another way to add the height of the tower is to use an offset variable. Offset values can be added to a sending tower as well as a receiving tower. The offset value is then added to the elevation value of the cell to obtain the actual elevation of each tower.

The viewshed analysis can also have a limited viewing angle. The viewing angle, or azimuth, of the radio tower can be incorporated into the calculation by adding two values. The first value is the lowest possible azimuth angle and the second value is the highest possible azimuth angle. The program will analyze the viewshed only within these given azimuth angles. A vertical angle can be added as well. The values for vertical angle are from 90° (looking straight up) to -90° (looking straight down). This variable would need to be added in cases where the radio tower emits a very narrow vertical beam. The final variable used in the viewshed analysis is the radius value. In the case of the radio tower, if the radio signal has a limited range, perhaps 10 miles, then the radius variable can be set to limit the viewshed analysis to a 10-mile radius.

== Viewshed analysis uses ==
Besides tower placement a viewshed analysis can be used for other applications. For example, a viewshed analysis could estimate the impact of the addition of a large building. The viewshed analysis would show all the areas from which the building could be seen as well as any views that would be obscured from any particular location. Viewshed analyses are also used to locate fire observation stations in mountain areas (Lee and Stucky, 1998). This allows the stations to be placed so that the entire forest can be observed for possible fires.

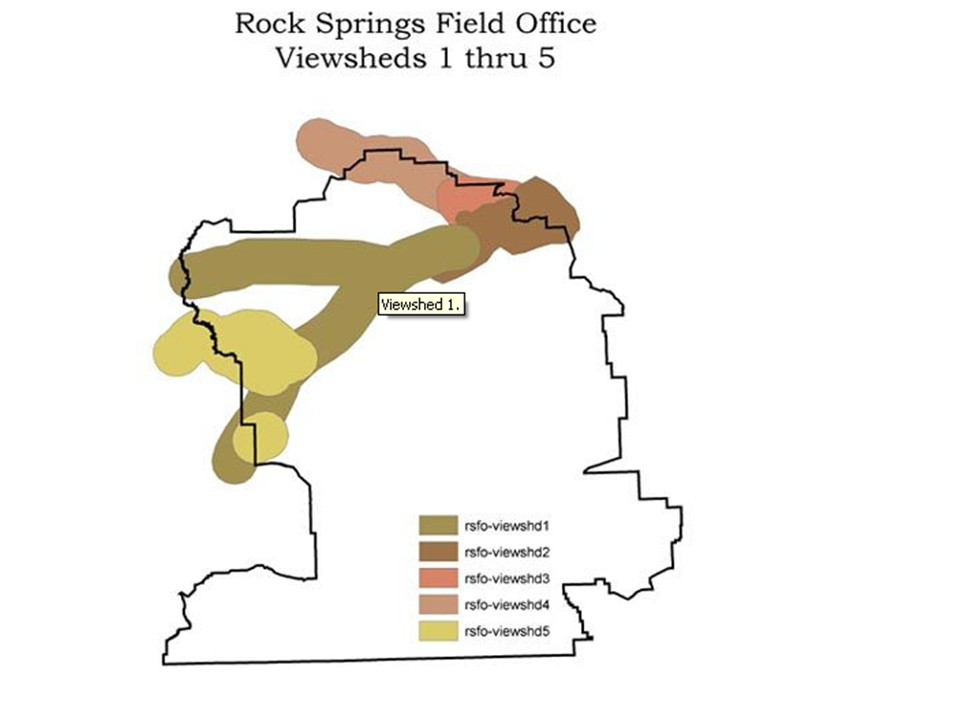
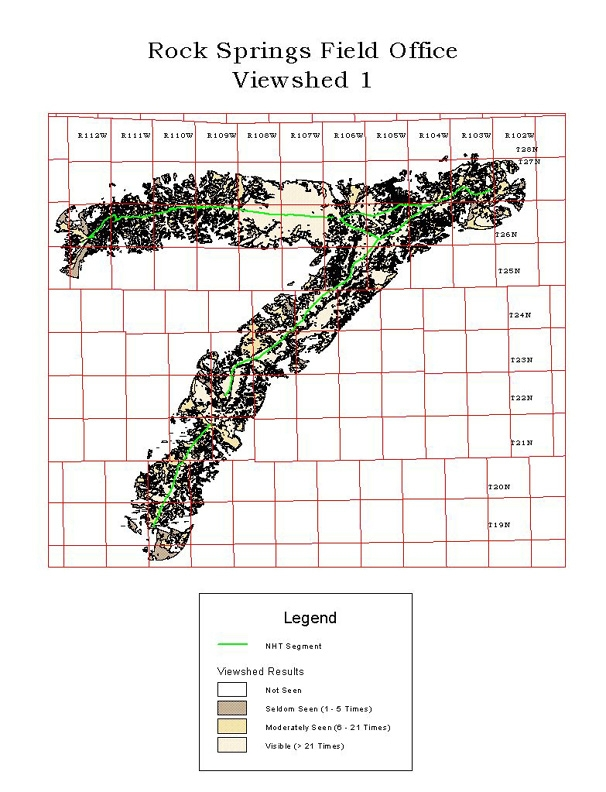
Viewshed map from National Historic Trails in the vicinity of Rock Springs, Wyoming

An example of using a viewshed analysis on a line segment is from the Wyoming State Office, Bureau of Land Management, in which the office used a viewshed analysis to determine the visibility from National Historic Trails across Wyoming. Within the Rock Springs Field Office area there are five different viewsheds to choose from. The example here is viewshed number one. The viewshed indicates the land areas visible from the trails at four different levels from not visible to visible, based on the number of times the area could be seen from the trail. This is an indication of what the pioneers could see as they traveled along the trails of the western frontier (Rock Springs Field Office).

== A unique viewshed analysis ==
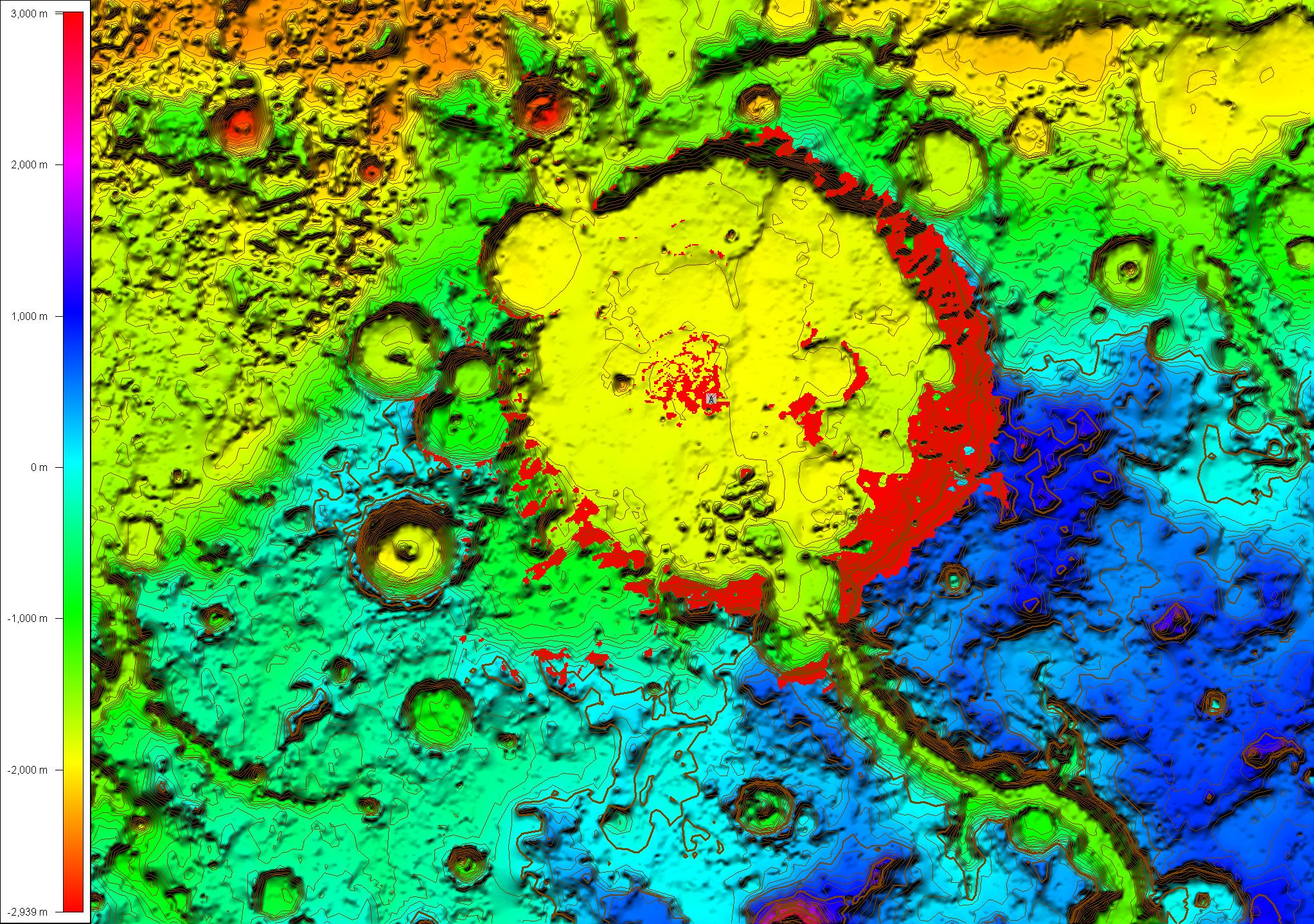
Gusev crater on Mars: the viewshed (red) is overlaid on an elevation map

In another example the United States Geological Survey (USGS) used a viewshed analysis to assist NASA's Mars Exploration Rover (MER) project. When NASA needed to find appropriate landing spots for the Mars rovers, they turned to the USGS to map the best possible sites. Part of the analysis included a viewshed of the possible site selections. In this case the viewshed indicates the areas which may or may not be visible by the Mars rovers from each landing site (MER Landing Site Viewshed Analysis).

== Bibliography ==
- Lee, J., & Stucky, D. (1998). On Applying Viewshed Analysis for Determining Least-cost Paths on Digital Elevation Models. International Journal of Geographical Information Science, 12(8), 891-905.
- MER Landing Site Viewshed Analysis. (2007). In Mars Exploration Rover Project. Retrieved March 16, 2009.
- Performing a Viewshed Analysis. (2007, March 15). In ArcGIS 9.2 Desktop Help. Retrieved March 3, 2009, from www.esri.com
- Rock Springs Field Office. (2001). National Historical Trail Viewsheds. Bureau of Land Management. Retrieved March 16, 2009.
- Wu, H., Pan, M., Yao, L., & Luo, B. (2007). A Partition-based Serial Algorithm for Generating Viewshed on Massive DEMs. International Journal of Geographical Information Science, 21(9), 955-964.
