= Jay Appleton =

British geographer

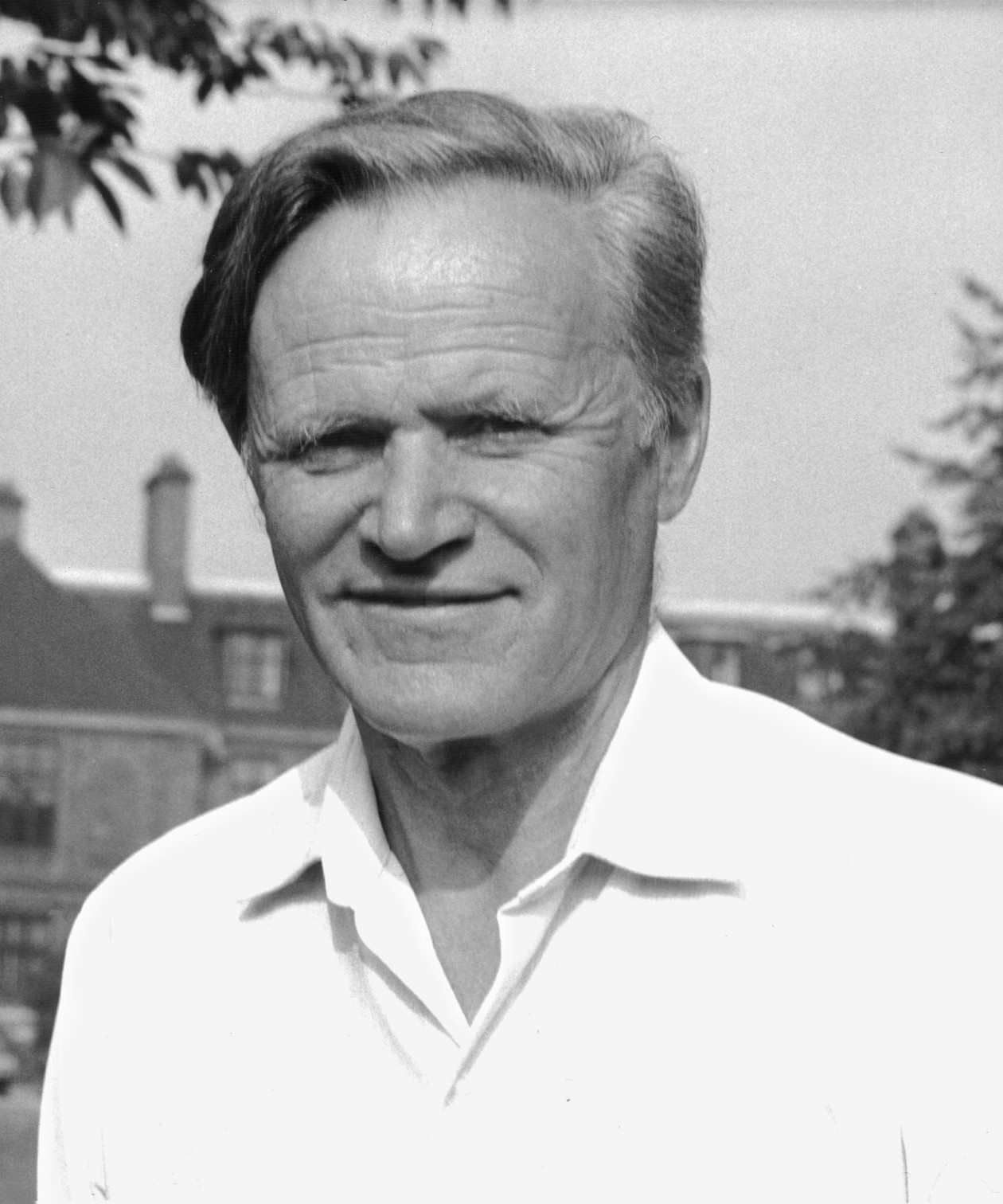
Jay Appleton at Hull University in the 1960s.

Jay Appleton (1919 – 27 April 2015) was a British geographer who proposed "habitat theory" and advanced the notion of "prospect-refuge".

== Biography ==
Appleton was born in Yorkshire in December 1919. His parents moved to Stibbard, near Fakenham in Norfolk, when he was eighteen months. In 1940, he moved south to Diss, but ten years later a university appointment took him back to Yorkshire, and he lived in Cottingham until his death.

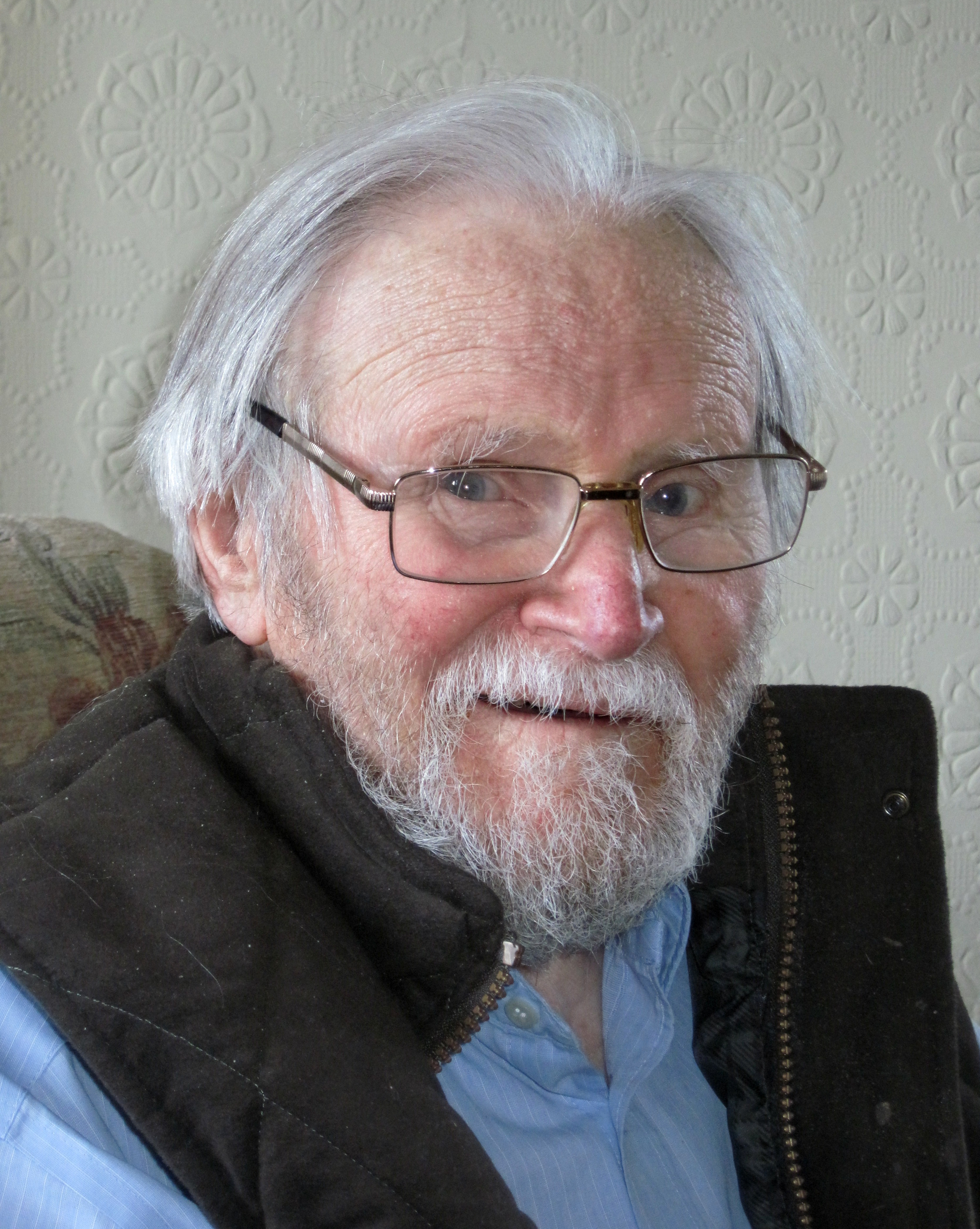
Jay Appleton in January, 2013.

== Academic career ==
Appleton was an alumnus of the University of Oxford and the University of Durham where he attended King's College, which is now Newcastle University. He retired in 1985 as an Emeritus Professor of Geography at Hull University.

He was a Human Geographer with a special interest in transport and in 1962 he published "The Geography of Communications in Great Britain".

In 1970, he wrote a report for the Countryside Commission on "Disused railways in the countryside of England and Wales".

In 1975, Appleton published The Experience of Landscape, in which he proposed the prospect-refuge theory of human aesthetics. The theory states that taste in art is "an acquired preference for particular methods of satisfying inborn desires". The two desires are for opportunity (prospect) and safety (refuge). Tracing these two desires gives us a means of understanding successful and enduring aesthetics, and the ability to predict the same.

== Other work ==
During the early 1950s, he began writing Norfolk dialect stories and reading them from Birmingham on the Midland Region Programme of the BBC. More stories were specially written to mark the opening of the BBC studios at St Catherine’s Close in Norwich in 1958.

He was also a published poet.
