= Spatial network =

Network representing spatial objects

A random geometric graph, one of the simplest models of spatial network

A spatial network (sometimes also geometric graph) is a graph in which the vertices or edges are spatial elements associated with geometric objects, i.e., the nodes are located in a space equipped with a certain metric. The simplest mathematical realization of spatial network is a lattice or a random geometric graph (see figure in the right), where nodes are distributed uniformly at random over a two-dimensional plane; a pair of nodes are connected if the Euclidean distance is smaller than a given neighborhood radius. Transportation and mobility networks, Internet, mobile phone networks, power grids, social and contact networks and biological neural networks are all examples where the underlying space is relevant and where the graph's topology alone does not contain all the information. Characterizing and understanding the structure, resilience and the evolution of spatial networks is crucial for many different fields ranging from urbanism to epidemiology.

== Examples ==
An urban spatial network can be constructed by abstracting intersections as nodes and streets as links, which is referred to as a transportation network.

One might think of the 'space map' as being the negative image of the standard map, with the open space cut out of the background buildings or walls.

== Characterizing spatial networks ==
The following aspects are some of the characteristics to examine a spatial network:

- Planar networks

In many applications, such as railways, roads, and other transportation networks, the network is assumed to be planar. Planar networks build up an important group out of the spatial networks, but not all spatial networks are planar. Indeed, the airline passenger networks is a non-planar example: Many large airports in the world are connected through direct flights.

- The way it is embedded in space

There are examples of networks, which seem to be not "directly" embedded in space. Social networks for instance connect individuals through friendship relations. But in this case, space intervenes in the fact that the connection probability between two individuals usually decreases with the distance between them.

- Voronoi tessellation

A spatial network can be represented by a Voronoi diagram, which is a way of dividing space into a number of regions. The dual graph for a Voronoi diagram corresponds to the Delaunay triangulation for the same set of points. Voronoi tessellations are interesting for spatial networks in the sense that they provide a natural representation model to which one can compare a real world network.

- Mixing space and topology

Examining the topology of the nodes and edges itself is another way to characterize networks. The distribution of degree of the nodes is often considered, regarding the structure of edges it is useful to find the Minimum spanning tree, or the generalization, the Steiner tree and the relative neighborhood graph.

== Probability and spatial networks ==
In the "real" world, many aspects of networks are not deterministic - randomness plays an important role. For example, new links, representing friendships, in social networks are in a certain manner random. Modelling spatial networks in respect of stochastic operations is consequent. In many cases the spatial Poisson process is used to approximate data sets of processes on spatial networks. Other stochastic aspects of interest are:

- The Poisson line process
- Stochastic geometry: the Erdős–Rényi graph
- Percolation theory

== Approach from the theory of space syntax ==
Another definition of spatial network derives from the theory of space syntax. It can be notoriously difficult to decide what a spatial element should be in complex spaces involving large open areas or many interconnected paths. The originators of space syntax, Bill Hillier and Julienne Hanson use axial lines and convex spaces as the spatial elements. Loosely, an axial line is the 'longest line of sight and access' through open space, and a convex space the 'maximal convex polygon' that can be drawn in open space. Each of these elements is defined by the geometry of the local boundary in different regions of the space map. Decomposition of a space map into a complete set of intersecting axial lines or overlapping convex spaces produces the axial map or overlapping convex map respectively. Algorithmic definitions of these maps exist, and this allows the mapping from an arbitrary shaped space map to a network amenable to graph mathematics to be carried out in a relatively well defined manner. Axial maps are used to analyse urban networks, where the system generally comprises linear segments, whereas convex maps are more often used to analyse building plans where space patterns are often more convexly articulated, however both convex and axial maps may be used in either situation.

Currently, there is a move within the space syntax community to integrate better with geographic information systems (GIS), and much of the software they produce interlinks with commercially available GIS systems.

== History ==
While networks and graphs were already for a long time the subject of many studies in mathematics, physics, mathematical sociology, computer science, spatial networks have been also studied intensively during the 1970s in quantitative geography. Objects of studies in geography are inter alia locations, activities and flows of individuals, but also networks evolving in time and space. Most of the important problems such as the location of nodes of a network, the evolution of transportation networks and their interaction with population and activity density are addressed in these earlier studies. On the other side, many important points still remain unclear, partly because at that time datasets of large networks and larger computer capabilities were lacking. Recently, spatial networks have been the subject of studies in Statistics, to connect probabilities and stochastic processes with networks in the real world.

== See also ==
- Hyperbolic geometric graph
- Spatial network analysis software – Type of Analytic Software
- Cascading failure – Systemic risk of failure
- Complex network – Network with non-trivial topological features
- Planar graphs – Graph that can be embedded in the plane
- Percolation theory – Mathematical theory on behavior of connected clusters in a random graph
- Modularity (networks) – Measure of network community structure
- Random graphs – Graph generated by a random process
- Topological graph theory – Branch of the mathematical field of graph theory
- Small-world network – Graph where most nodes are reachable in a small number of steps
- Chemical graph – Representation of molecules in terms of graph theory
- Interdependent networks – Subfield of network science
