= Visibility graph =

Graph of intervisible locations in computational geometry

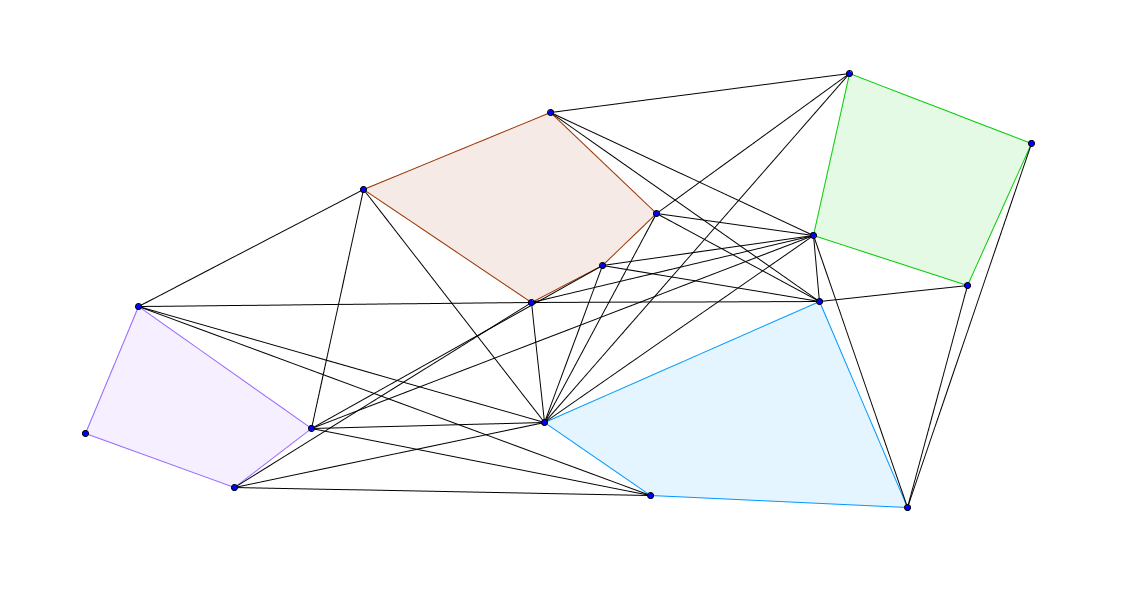
Example of visibility graph

In computational geometry and robot motion planning, a visibility graph is a graph of intervisible locations, typically for a set of points and obstacles in the Euclidean plane. Each node in the graph represents a point location, and each edge represents a visible connection between them. That is, if the line segment connecting two locations does not pass through any obstacle, an edge is drawn between them in the graph. When the set of locations lies in a line, this can be understood as an ordered series. Visibility graphs have therefore been extended to the realm of time series analysis.

== Applications ==
Visibility graphs may be used to find Euclidean shortest paths among a set of polygonal obstacles in the plane: the shortest path between two obstacles follows straight line segments except at the vertices of the obstacles, where it may turn, so the Euclidean shortest path is the shortest path in a visibility graph that has as its nodes the start and destination points and the vertices of the obstacles. Therefore, the Euclidean shortest path problem may be decomposed into two simpler subproblems: constructing the visibility graph, and applying a shortest path algorithm such as Dijkstra's algorithm to the graph. For planning the motion of a robot that has non-negligible size compared to the obstacles, a similar approach may be used after expanding the obstacles to compensate for the size of the robot. Lozano-Pérez & Wesley (1979) attribute the visibility graph method for Euclidean shortest paths to research in 1969 by Nils Nilsson on motion planning for Shakey the robot, and also cite a 1973 description of this method by Russian mathematicians M. B. Ignat'yev, F. M. Kulakov, and A. M. Pokrovskiy.

Visibility graphs may also be used to calculate the placement of radio antennas, or as a tool used within architecture and urban planning through visibility graph analysis.

The visibility graph of a set of locations that lie in a line can be interpreted as a graph-theoretical representation of a time series. This particular case builds a bridge between time series, dynamical systems and graph theory.

== Characterization ==
The visibility graph of a simple polygon has the polygon's vertices as its point locations, and the exterior of the polygon as the only obstacle. Visibility graphs of simple polygons must be Hamiltonian graphs: the boundary of the polygon forms a Hamiltonian cycle in the visibility graph. It is known that not all visibility graphs induce a simple polygon. However, an efficient algorithmic characterization of the visibility graphs of simple polygons remains unknown. These graphs do not fall into many known families of well-structured graphs: they might not be perfect graphs, circle graphs, or chordal graphs. An exception to this phenomenon is that the visibility graphs of simple polygons are cop-win graphs.

Recognizing the visibility graph of a finite set of points in the Euclidean plane is complete for the existential theory of the reals.

== Related problems ==
The art gallery problem is the problem of finding a small set of points such that all other non-obstacle points are visible from this set. Certain forms of the art gallery problem may be interpreted as finding a dominating set in a visibility graph.

The bitangents of a system of polygons or curves are lines that touch two of them without penetrating them at their points of contact. The bitangents of a set of polygons form a subset of the visibility graph that has the polygon's vertices as its nodes and the polygons themselves as the obstacles. The visibility graph approach to the Euclidean shortest path problem may be sped up by forming a graph from the bitangents instead of using all visibility edges, since a Euclidean shortest path may only enter or leave the boundary of an obstacle along a bitangent.

== See also ==
- Visibility graph analysis
- Fuzzy architectural spatial analysis
- Space syntax
