= Proximity problems =

Distance estimation problems in computational geometry

Proximity problems is a class of problems in computational geometry which involve estimation of distances between geometric objects.

A subset of these problems stated in terms of points only are sometimes referred to as closest point problems, although the term "closest point problem" is also used synonymously to the nearest neighbor search.

A common trait for many of these problems is the possibility to establish the Θ(n log n) lower bound on their computational complexity by reduction from the element uniqueness problem basing on an observation that if there is an efficient algorithm to compute some kind of minimal distance for a set of objects, it is trivial to check whether this distance equals 0.

== Atomic problems ==
While these problems pose no computational complexity challenge, some of them are notable because of their ubiquity in computer applications of geometry.

- Distance between a pair of line segments. It cannot be expressed by a single formula, unlike, e.g., the distance from a point to a line. Its calculation requires careful enumeration of possible configurations, especially in 3D and higher dimensions.
- Bounding box, the minimal axis-aligned hyperrectangle that contains all geometric data

== Problems on points ==
- Closest pair of points: Given N points, find two with the smallest distance between them
- Closest point query / nearest neighbor query: Given N points, find one with the smallest distance to a given query point
- All nearest neighbors problem (construction of the nearest-neighbor graph): Given N points, find a closest one for each of them
- Diameter (computational geometry): Given N points, find two with the largest distance between them
- Width of a point set: Given N points, find two (hyper)planes with the smallest distance between them and with all points between them
- Minimum spanning tree for a set of points
  - Euclidean minimum spanning tree
- Delaunay triangulation
- Voronoi diagram
- Smallest enclosing sphere: Given N points, find a smallest sphere (circle) enclosing them all
- Largest empty circle: Given N points in the plane, find a largest circle centered within their convex hull and enclosing none of them
- Smallest enclosing rectangle: unlike the bounding box problem mentioned above, the rectangle may be of any orientation
- Largest empty rectangle
- Geometric spanner, a weighted graph over a set of points as its vertices which for every pair of vertices has a path between them of weight at most 'k' times the spatial distance between these points for a fixed 'k'.

== Other ==
- Shortest path among obstacles
- Distance of closest approach
