= Raimund Seidel =

German and Austrian theoretical computer scientist

Raimund G. Seidel is a German and Austrian theoretical computer scientist and an expert in computational geometry.

Seidel was born in Graz, Austria, and studied with Hermann Maurer at the Graz University of Technology. He earned his M.Sc. in 1981 from University of British Columbia under David G. Kirkpatrick. He received his Ph.D. in 1987 from Cornell University under the supervision of John Gilbert. After teaching at the University of California, Berkeley, he moved in 1994 to Saarland University. In 1997, he and Christoph M. Hoffmann were program chairs for the Symposium on Computational Geometry. He was the vice president for Research and Technology Transfer at Saarland University from 1999 to 2003. In 2014, he took over as Scientific Director of the Leibniz Center for Informatics (LZI) from Reinhard Wilhelm. In May 2025, he was succeeded in this position by Holger Hermans. Seidel was elected as the vice president for Sustainable Development and Strategy of Saarland University in 2024.

Seidel invented backwards analysis of randomized algorithms and used it to analyze a simple linear programming algorithm that runs in linear time for problems of bounded dimension. With his student Cecilia R. Aragon in 1989 he devised the treap data structure, and he is also known for the Kirkpatrick–Seidel algorithm for computing two-dimensional convex hulls.
