= Gift wrapping algorithm =

Algorithm for computing convex hulls in a set of points

Animation of the gift wrapping algorithm. With different colored lines where it shows different angles, the color changes each time when it finishes finding the optimal point.

In computational geometry, the gift wrapping algorithm is an algorithm for computing the convex hull of a given set of points.

== Planar case ==
In the two-dimensional case the algorithm is also known as Jarvis march, after R. A. Jarvis, who published it in 1973; it has O(nh) time complexity, where n is the number of points and h is the number of points on the convex hull. Its real-life performance compared with other convex hull algorithms is favorable when n is small or h is expected to be very small with respect to n. In general cases, the algorithm is outperformed by many others (see Convex hull algorithms).

== Algorithm ==
For the sake of simplicity, the description below assumes that the points are in general position, i.e., no three points are collinear. The algorithm may be easily modified to deal with collinearity, including the choice whether it should report only extreme points (vertices of the convex hull) or all points that lie on the convex hull. Also, the complete implementation must choose how to deal with degenerate cases when the convex hull has only 1 or 2 vertices, as well as with the issues of limited arithmetic precision, both of computer computations and input data.

The gift wrapping algorithm begins with i=0 and a point p_{0} known to be on the convex hull, e.g., the leftmost point, and selects the point p_{i+1} such that all points are to the right of the line p_{i} p_{i+1}. This point may be found in O(n) time by comparing polar angles of all points with respect to point p_{i} taken for the center of polar coordinates. Letting i=i+1, and repeating with until one reaches p_{h}=p_{0} again yields the convex hull in h steps. In two dimensions, the gift wrapping algorithm is similar to the process of winding a string (or wrapping paper) around the set of points.

The approach can be extended to higher dimensions.

== Pseudocode ==
Jarvis's march computing the convex hull.

algorithm jarvis(S) is
    // S is the set of points
    // P will be the set of points which form the convex hull. Final set size is i.
    pointOnHull := leftmost point in S // which is guaranteed to be part of the CH(S)
    i := 0
    repeat
        P[i] := pointOnHull
        endpoint := S[0]      // initial endpoint for a candidate edge on the hull
        for j from 0 to |S| do
            // endpoint == pointOnHull is a rare case and can happen only when j == 1 and a better endpoint has not yet been set for the loop
            if (endpoint == pointOnHull) or (S[j] is on left of line from P[i] to endpoint) then
                endpoint := S[j]   // found greater left turn, update endpoint
        i := i + 1
        pointOnHull := endpoint
    until endpoint == P[0]      // wrapped around to first hull point

== Complexity ==
The inner loop checks every point in the set S, and the outer loop repeats for each point on the hull. Hence the total run time is $O(nh)$. The run time depends on the size of the output, so Jarvis's march is an output-sensitive algorithm.

However, because the running time depends linearly on the number of hull vertices, it is only faster than $O(n \log n)$ algorithms such as Graham scan when the number h of hull vertices is smaller than log n. Chan's algorithm, another convex hull algorithm, combines the logarithmic dependence of Graham scan with the output sensitivity of the gift wrapping algorithm, achieving an asymptotic running time $O(n \log h)$ that improves on both Graham scan and gift wrapping.

== See also ==
- Convex hull algorithms
