= Timothy M. Chan =

Canadian computer scientist

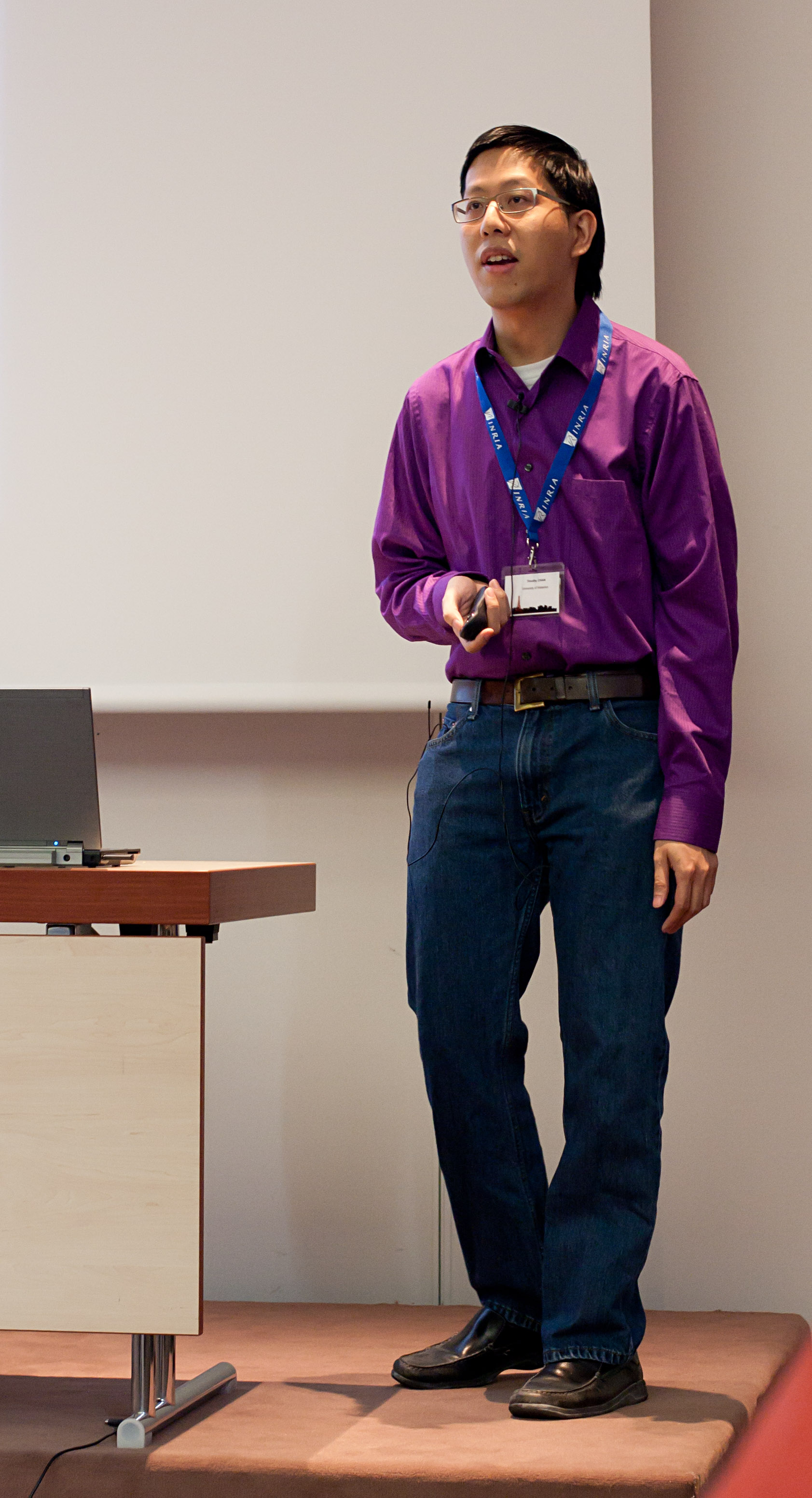
Timothy Chan at SoCG 2011

Timothy Moon-Yew Chan is a professor in the Department of Computer Science at the University of Illinois at Urbana–Champaign. He was formerly Professor and University Research Chair in the David R. Cheriton School of Computer Science, University of Waterloo, Canada.

He graduated with BA (summa cum laude) from Rice University in 1992, and completed his Ph.D. in Computer Science at UBC in 1995 at the age of 19.

== Recognition ==
He was awarded the Governor General's Gold Medal (as Head of Graduating Class in the Faculty of Graduate Studies at the University of British Columbia during convocation), the NSERC doctoral prize, and the Premier's Research Excellence Award (PREA) of Ontario, Canada.

He was elected as an ACM Fellow in 2019 "for contributions to computational geometry, algorithms, and data structures".

== See also ==
- Chan's algorithm, an output-sensitive algorithm for planar convex hulls
