= Cecilia R. Aragon =

American computer scientist, author, and aerobatic pilot

- Education: California Institute of Technology (BS); University of California, Berkeley (MS, PhD)
- Known for: Co-invention of treap data structure
- Awards: Presidential Early Career Award for Scientists and Engineers; ACM Distinguished Member
- Scientific career
- Fields: Computer science
- Workplaces: University of Washington; Lawrence Berkeley National Laboratory; NASA Ames Research Center
- Thesis: Improving aviation safety with information visualization: Airflow hazard display for helicopter pilots (2004)
- Doctoral advisor: Marti Hearst
- Website: ceciliaaragonauthor.com

Cecilia Rodriguez Aragon is an American computer scientist, professor emeritus, author, and champion aerobatic pilot who is best known as the co-inventor (with Raimund Seidel) of the treap data structure, a type of binary search tree that orders nodes by adding a priority as well as a key to each node. She is also known for her work in data-intensive science and visual analytics of very large data sets, for which she received the prestigious Presidential Early Career Award for Scientists and Engineers (PECASE).

== Education ==
Aragon received her B.S. in mathematics from the California Institute of Technology in 1982, M.S. from the University of California, Berkeley in 1987 and, Ph.D. in computer science from the same institution in 2004. For her doctoral studies, Aragon worked under the direction of Marti Hearst.

== Career ==
She is a professor emeritus in the Department of Human Centered Design and Engineering at the University of Washington in Seattle since her retirement in January 2026. Her research interests in the field of human-centered data science include eScience, scientific and information visualization, visual analytics, image processing, collaborative creativity, analysis of spontaneous text communication, dynamic affect detection, and games for good. Prior to her appointment at UW, she was a computer scientist and data scientist at Lawrence Berkeley National Laboratory for six years and NASA Ames Research Center for nine years, and before that, an airshow and test pilot, entrepreneur, and member of the United States Aerobatic Team. In 2009, the Hispanic Business Magazine named Aragon one of the Top 25 Women.

=== Presidential Early Career Award ===
On July 9, 2009, Aragon received a Presidential Early Career Award for Scientists and Engineers, the highest honor bestowed by the United States government on outstanding scientists and engineers in the early stages of their independent research careers. She was recognized for "seminal research in workflow management and visual analytics for data-intensive scientific research, including the development of the Fourier contour analysis algorithm and Sunfall."

=== Aerobatic career ===
Aragon first won a slot on the United States Aerobatic Team in 1991. She holds the record for shortest time from first solo in an airplane to membership on the US Team (less than six years), and was also the first Latina to win a slot on the Team.

A team member from 1991 to 1994, she was a bronze medalist at the 1993 U.S. National Aerobatic Championships and the 1994 World Aerobatic Championships. She has also won over 70 trophies in regional aerobatic competitions at the Unlimited level and was California State Unlimited Aerobatic Champion in 1990. Aragon has also flown airshows (as distinct from aerobatic competitions) professionally since 1990.

Aragon has been a flight instructor since 1987. In 1989, she founded one of the first aerobatic and tailwheel flight schools in Northern California.

Aragon helped develop an "unusual attitude recovery training", whereby flight students are taught how to recover from emergency situations in flight. Between 1987 and 2008, she was a flight instructor at Oakland, Livermore, and Tracy Airports, giving over 2400 hours of flight instruction and over 3000 hours of ground instruction.

=== Autobiography ===
In September 2020, Aragon's memoir, Flying Free, was published by Blackstone Publishing. Her autobiography was listed in September 2020 Ms. Magazine book list. Her book won the 2021 PNWA Nancy Pearl award.

== Bibliography ==
=== Selected scientific papers ===
- Aragon, Cecilia R.; Seidel, Raimund (1989). Randomized Search Trees (PDF). Symposium on Foundations of Computer Science. IEEE Computer Society Press. pp. 540–545. doi:10.1109/SFCS.1989.63531. ISBN 0-8186-1982-1.
- Johnson, David S.; Aragon, Cecilia R.; McGeoch, Lyle A.; Schevon, Catherine (November–December 1989). "Optimization by Simulated Annealing: An Experimental Evaluation; Part I, Graph Partitioning". Operations Research. 37 (6): 853–992. doi:10.1287/opre.37.6.865.
- Seidel, Raimund; Aragon, Cecilia R. (October 1996). "Randomized search trees". Algorithmica. 16 (4–5): 464–497. doi:10.1007/BF01940876. S2CID 9370259.
- Pritoni, Marco; Meier, Alan K; Aragon, Cecilia; Perry, Daniel; Peffer, Therese (July 2015). "Energy efficiency and the misuse of programmable thermostats: The effectiveness of crowdsourcing for understanding household behavior". Energy Research & Social Science. 8: 190–197. doi:10.1016/j.erss.2015.06.002.

=== Non-science non-fiction books ===
- Aragon, Cecilia; Davis, Katie (August 2019). Writers in the Secret Garden: Fanfiction, Youth, and New Forms of Mentoring. MIT Press. ISBN 978-0262537803. OCLC 1192499682.
- Aragon, Cecilia (September 2020). Flying Free: My Victory over Fear to Become the First Latina Pilot on the US Aerobatic Team. Blackstone Publishing. ISBN 978-1982642464. OCLC 1137834616.

=== Short stories (fiction) ===
- Aragon, Cecilia (September 2014). "Lace Round the Sky". Cricket.
- Aragon, Cecilia (January 13, 2015). "Green or Not At All". self.
- Aragon, Cecilia (August 2016). "The Banana Festival". Jersey Devil Press. No. 81.
- Aragon, Cecilia (February 2017). "Emotional Contagion". In Frisch, Æleen (ed.). Lost: Reflections (anthology). Medusa's Laugh Press. ISBN 978-0-9771680-3-3.

=== Newspaper ===
- Aragon, Cecilia R. (October 5, 2019). "A higher purpose for fan fiction? Yes! It's helping teach young and marginalized people to write, says UW professor". Seattle Times.
