= Marti Hearst =

American computer scientist

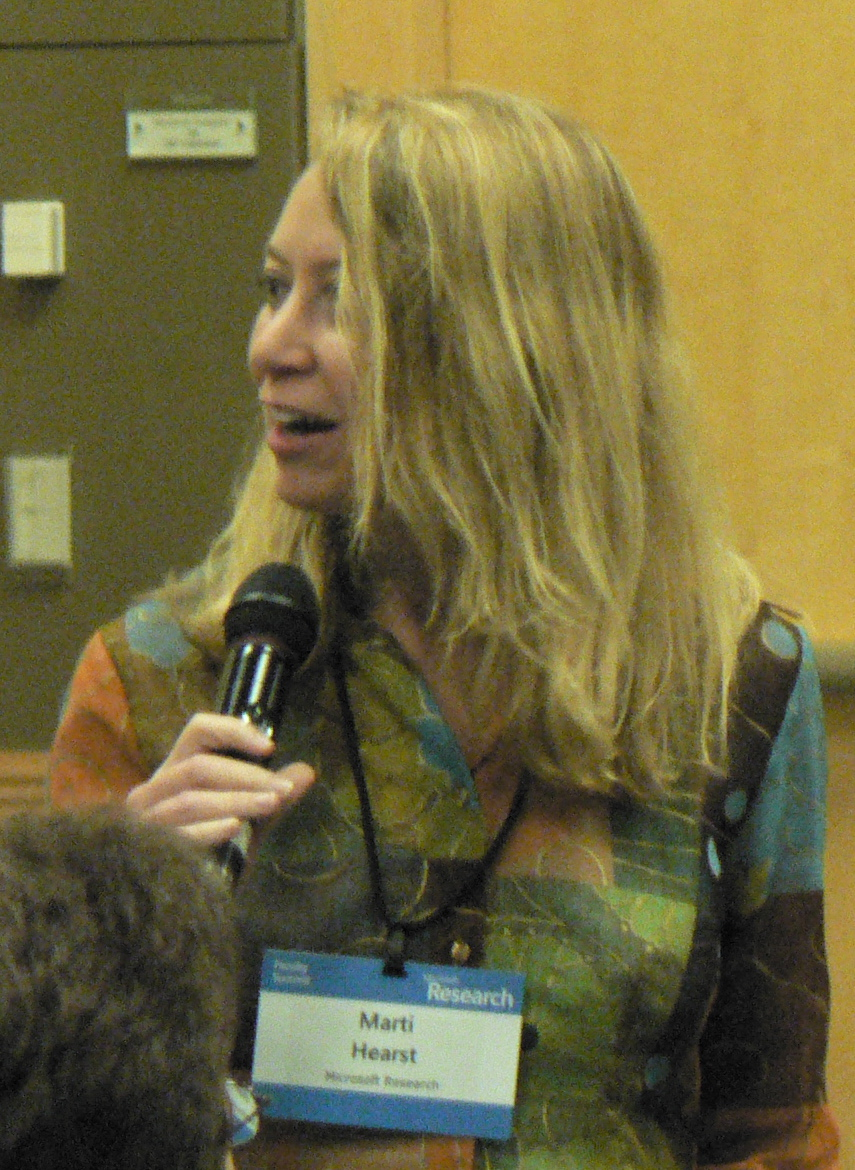
- Hearst in 2008
- Education: University of California, Berkeley (BA, MS, PhD)
- Known for: Hearst patterns
- Awards: NSF CAREER Award, IBM Faculty Award, Okawa Foundation Fellowship, Google Research Awards, Excellence in Teaching Awards
- Scientific career
- Fields: Computer Science
- Workplaces: University of California, Berkeley; Xerox Palo Alto Research Center
- Thesis: Context and structure in automated full-text information access (1994)
- Doctoral advisor: Robert Wilensky
- Other academic advisors: Michael Stonebraker
- Doctoral students: Cecilia R. Aragon
- Website: people.ischool.berkeley.edu/~hearst/

Marti Alice Hearst is a professor in the School of Information at the University of California, Berkeley. She did early work in corpus-based computational linguistics, including some of the first work in automating sentiment analysis, and word sense disambiguation. She invented an algorithm that became known as "Hearst patterns" which applies lexico-syntactic patterns to recognize hyponymy (ISA) relations with high accuracy in large text collections, including an early application of it to WordNet; this algorithm is widely used in commercial text mining applications including ontology learning. Hearst also developed early work in automatic segmentation of text into topical discourse boundaries, inventing a now well-known approach called TextTiling.

Hearst's research is on user interfaces for search engine technology and big data analytics. She did early work in user interfaces and information visualization for search user interfaces, inventing the TileBars query term visualization. Her Flamenco research project investigated and developed the now widely used faceted navigation approach for searching and browsing web sites and information collections. She wrote the first academic book on the topic of Search User Interfaces (Cambridge University Press, 2009).

Hearst is an Edge Foundation contributing author and a member of the Usage panel of the American Heritage Dictionary of the English Language.

Hearst received her B.A., M.S., and Ph.D. in computer science, all from Berkeley. In 2013 she became a fellow of the Association for Computing Machinery. She became a member of the CHI Academy in 2017, and has previously served as president of the Association for Computational Linguistics and on the advisory council of NSF's CISE Directorate. Additionally, she has been a member of the Web Board for CACM, the Usage Panel for the American Heritage Dictionary, the Edge.org panel of experts, the research staff at Xerox PARC, and the boards of ACM Transactions on the Web, Computational Linguistics, ACM Transactions on Information Systems, and IEEE Intelligent Systems.

Hearst has received an NSF CAREER award, an IBM Faculty Award, and an Okawa Foundation Fellowship. Her work on user interfaces has had a profound impact on the industry, earning Hearst two Google Research Awards and four Excellence in Teaching Awards. She has also led projects worth over $3.5M in research grants.

Hearst’s publications date back to 1990, when ‘A Hybrid Approach to Restricted Text Interpretation’ was published in Stanford University’s AAAI Spring Symposium on Text Based Intelligent Systems in March of that year.
