= Robust geometric computation =

In mathematics, specifically in computational geometry, geometric nonrobustness is a problem wherein branching decisions in computational geometry algorithms are based on approximate numerical computations, leading to various forms of unreliability including ill-formed output and software failure through crashing or infinite loops.

For instance, algorithms for problems like the construction of a convex hull rely on testing whether certain "numerical predicates" have values that are positive, negative, or zero. If an inexact floating-point computation causes a value that is near zero to have a different sign than its exact value, the resulting inconsistencies can propagate through the algorithm causing it to produce output that is far from the correct output, or even to crash.

One method for avoiding this problem involves using integers rather than floating point numbers for all coordinates and other quantities represented by the algorithm, and determining the precision required for all calculations to avoid integer overflow conditions. For instance, two-dimensional convex hulls can be computed using predicates that test the sign of quadratic polynomials, and therefore may require twice as many bits of precision within these calculations as the input numbers. When integer arithmetic cannot be used (for instance, when the result of a calculation is an algebraic number rather than an integer or rational number), a second method is to use symbolic algebra to perform all computations with exactly represented algebraic numbers rather than numerical approximations to them. A third method, sometimes called a "floating point filter", is to compute numerical predicates first using an inexact method based on floating-point arithmetic, but to maintain bounds on how accurate the result is, and repeat the calculation using slower symbolic algebra methods or numerically with additional precision when these bounds do not separate the calculated value from zero.
