= David G. Kirkpatrick =

Canadian academic and computer scientist

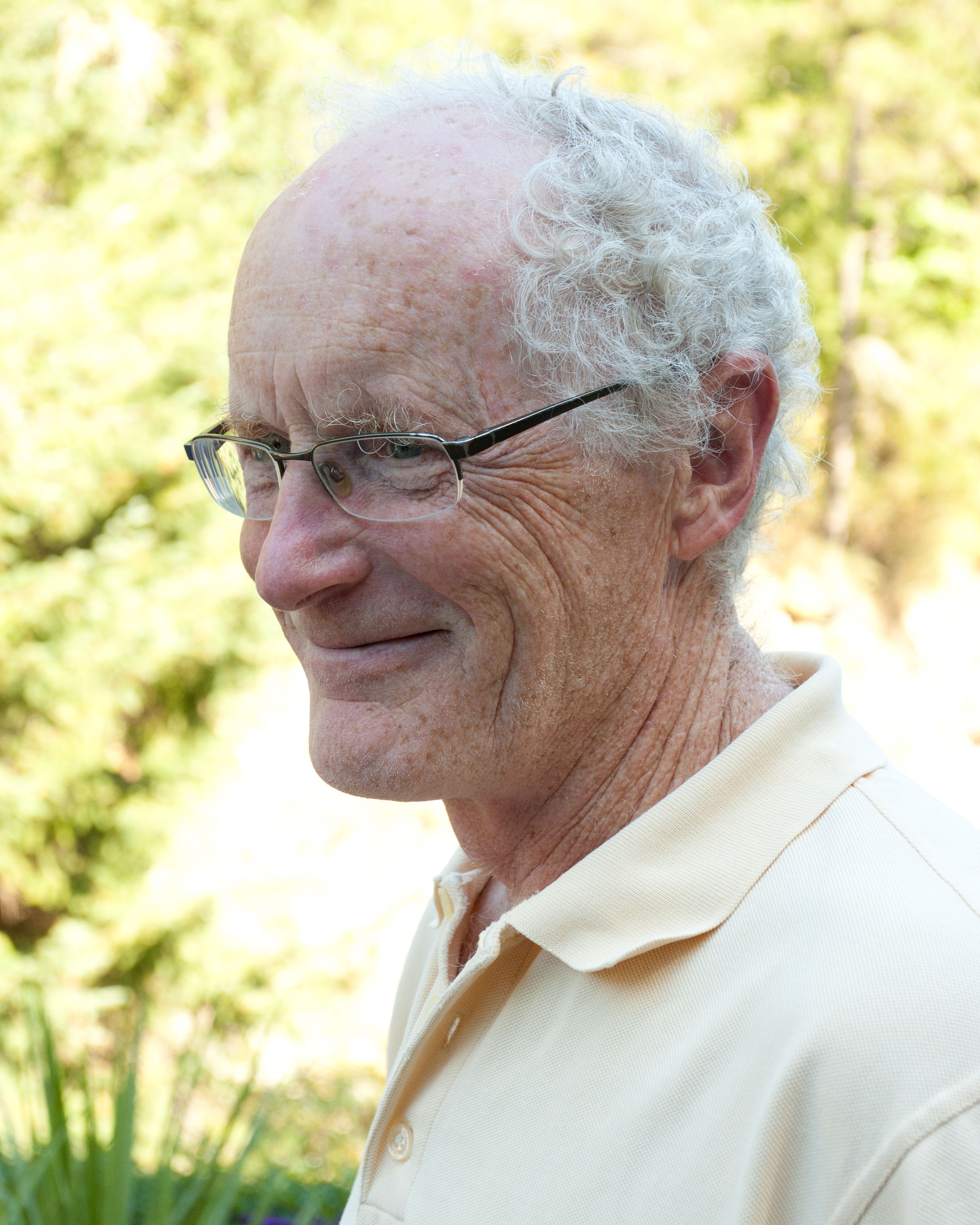
David Kirkpatrick at WADS 2015

David Galer Kirkpatrick is a Professor Emeritus of computer science at the University of British Columbia. He is known for the Kirkpatrick–Seidel algorithm and his work on polygon triangulation, and for co-inventing α-shapes and the β-skeleton. He received his PhD from the University of Toronto in 1974.

== Works ==
- Dissertation: Topics in the Complexity of Combinatorial Algorithms, University of Toronto 1974
