= Nesting algorithm =

Optimizing algorithm

Pictorial representations of three different types of nesting algorithms: Linear, Plate and Packing

Nesting algorithms are used to make the most efficient use of material or space. This could for instance be done by evaluating many different possible combinations via recursion.

1. Linear (1-dimensional): The simplest of the algorithms illustrated here. For an existing set there is only one position where a new cut can be placed – at the end of the last cut. Validation of a combination involves a simple Stock - Yield - Kerf = Scrap calculation.
2. Plate (2-dimensional): These algorithms are significantly more complex. For an existing set, there may be as many as eight positions where a new cut may be introduced next to each existing cut, and if the new cut is not perfectly square then different rotations may need to be checked. Validation of a potential combination involves checking for intersections between two-dimensional objects.
3. Packing (3-dimensional): These algorithms are the most complex illustrated here due to the larger number of possible combinations. Validation of a potential combination involves checking for intersections between three-dimensional objects.
