= Marching triangles =

Technique in computer graphics

In computer graphics, the problem of transforming a cloud of points on the surface of a three-dimensional object into a polygon mesh for the object can be solved by a technique called marching triangles. This provides a faster alternative to other methods for the same problem of surface reconstruction, based on Delaunay triangulation.
