= Minimum bounding box =

Smallest box which encloses some set of points

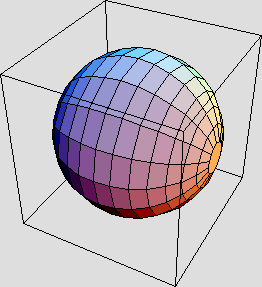
A sphere enclosed by its axis-aligned minimum bounding box (in 3 dimensions)

In geometry, the minimum bounding box or smallest bounding box (also known as the minimum enclosing box or smallest enclosing box) for a point set S in N dimensions is the box with the smallest measure (area, volume, or hypervolume in higher dimensions) within which all the points lie. When other kinds of measure are used, the minimum box is usually called accordingly, e.g., "minimum-perimeter bounding box".

The minimum bounding box of a point set is the same as the minimum bounding box of its convex hull, a fact which may be used heuristically to speed up computation.

In the two-dimensional case it is called the minimum bounding rectangle.

== Axis-aligned minimum bounding box ==
The axis-aligned minimum bounding box (or AABB) for a given point set is its minimum bounding box subject to the constraint that the edges of the box are parallel to the (Cartesian) coordinate axes. It is the Cartesian product of N intervals each of which is defined by the minimal and maximal value of the corresponding coordinate for the points in S.

Axis-aligned minimal bounding boxes are used as an approximate location of an object in question and as a very simple descriptor of its shape. For example, in computational geometry and its applications when it is required to find intersections in the set of objects, the initial check is the intersections between their MBBs. Since it is usually a much less expensive operation than the check of the actual intersection (because it only requires comparisons of coordinates), it allows quickly excluding checks of the pairs that are far apart.

== Arbitrarily oriented minimum bounding box ==
The arbitrarily oriented minimum bounding box is the minimum bounding box, calculated subject to no constraints as to the orientation of the result. Minimum bounding box algorithms based on the rotating calipers method can be used to find the minimum-area or minimum-perimeter bounding box of a two-dimensional convex polygon in linear time, and of a three-dimensional point set in the time it takes to construct its convex hull followed by a linear-time computation. A three-dimensional rotating calipers algorithm can find the minimum-volume arbitrarily-oriented bounding box of a three-dimensional point set in cubic time. Matlab implementations of the latter as well as the optimal compromise between accuracy and CPU time are available.

== Object-oriented minimum bounding box ==
In the case where an object has its own local coordinate system, it can be useful to store a bounding box relative to these axes, which requires no transformation as the object's own transformation changes.

== Digital image processing ==
In digital image processing, the bounding box is merely the coordinates of the rectangular border that fully encloses a digital image when it is placed over a page, a canvas, a screen or other similar bidimensional background.

== See also ==
- Bounding sphere
- Bounding volume
- Minimum bounding rectangle
- Darboux integral
