= Isothetic =

Isothetic (from Greek roots: iso- for "equal, same, similar" and thetos for position, placement) may refer to one of the following.

- In computational geometry, see isothetic polygon
    - Isothetic polyhedra
- In data analysis, isothetic lines, isothetic curves, or simply isothetics are contour lines for a data set, where data represent Displacements
