= The Fairly OddParents: Shadow Showdown =

2004 video game

- North American Windows cover art
- Developers: Blitz Games (GC, PS2); Helixe (GBA); ImaginEngine (PC)
- Publisher: THQ
- Director: Chris Viggers
- Producer: Team Cosmo
- Designer: Lauren Grindrod
- Programmers: Steve Bond; Matthew Hampton; Nigel Higgs; Philip Palmer
- Artists: Marc Buckingham; Simon Bennett Hayes; Heather Calder; Nadine Mathias; Eoghan Quigley; Simon Reed
- Writers: Chris Bateman; Richard Boon
- Composers: John Guscott; Matt Black
- Series: The Fairly OddParents
- Engine: BlitzTech
- Platforms: Microsoft Windows; Game Boy Advance; GameCube; PlayStation 2
- Release: PlayStation 2, Windows: NA: September 9, 2004; AU: October 29, 2004; EU: May 20, 2005; GameCube: NA: September 9, 2004; Game Boy Advance: NA: September 20, 2004; AU: October 29, 2004; EU: April 8, 2005
- Genre: Platform
- Mode: Single-player

The Fairly OddParents: Shadow Showdown is a 2004 platforming video game released for Microsoft Windows, GameCube, PlayStation 2, and Game Boy Advance by THQ. ImaginEngine developed the PC version, Blitz Games developed the console versions, and Helixe developed the Game Boy Advance version. The game is based on the animated series The Fairly OddParents and is the sequel to The Fairly OddParents: Breakin' Da Rules. A version for the Xbox was announced, but never released.

Shadow Showdown follows series protagonist Timmy Turner and his Fairy Godparents as they attempt to recover the stolen Royal Jewel, the source of fairy magic, so they can fix Timmy's TV in time to watch a show he has been looking forward too. The console, PC, and Game Boy Advance versions differ in gameplay. In the console versions, the gameplay involves traversing various stages, collecting Emergency Wish Stars to unlock wishes, and using said wishes to overcome various obstacles along the way. The Game Boy Advance version is similar in structure, but is a 2D platformer rather than 3D like the console versions. The PC version's gameplay differs further from other versions, being a minigame compilation.

Like its predecessor, Shadow Showdown received mixed reviews from critics for its graphics and gameplay. It is the second and last standalone Fairly OddParents video game released on consoles.

== Gameplay ==
Shadow Showdown uses a cel-shaded visual style in order to recreate the look of the TV Series. top: Timmy pursuing an Emergency Wish Star in the Fairly Disastrous stage. bottom: After collecting three Stars, Timmy has wished for the Spade Spray, which can be used to activate certain platforms. Wanda is commenting on the situation.

=== Home console versions ===
The gameplay of Shadow Showdown involves traversing through various locales as Timmy Turner. Each level has one end goal, but there are various obstacles and environmental puzzles which must be cleared to proceed. Clearing them usually requires the use of Wishes- abilities specific to each stage. To unlock a wish, Timmy must first chase down and collect three Emergency Wish Stars. Each stage has three Wishes, each with their own set of Emergency Wish Stars, and can be freely swapped between, with stages often requiring players to switch between them to solve puzzles.

At the end of each stage is a boss, which requires the use of one or more Wishes obtained in the prior level to defeat. After beating the first full stage, Fairly Disastrous, Timmy will enter Jorgen von Strangle's Base of Operations, a hub world in which all stages are accessed.

Timmy's Fairy Godparents, Cosmo and Wanda, will occasionally appear to provide hints as to what Timmy should do, but can also be called upon manually by the player with the press of a button.

=== Windows version ===
The Windows version of Shadow Showdown differs from the console versions, adapting the events and worlds depicted in those versions into various minigames. These include leading suits to their respective cards through a series of pipes, running down a path while avoiding obstacles, and navigating a maze with limited vision. Unlike in the console version, stage progression occurs in a strictly linear fashion in the default Story mode, though each stage can be accessed separately through a level select menu once completed. The cutscenes and graphics are depicted in the show's traditional 2D animation style.

=== Game Boy Advance version ===
The Game Boy Advance version is a 2D platformer in which stages are presented as a series of connected rooms traveled between via doors. The goal is simply to get to the end of the stage, where they will fight a boss. After defeating said boss, the player will collect a crystal and progress to the next stage.

Timmy's base moveset includes jumping, a ground pound, a dash, and the ability to pick up and carry blocks. Cosmo and Wanda have a larger role in gameplay than in the console version. By pressing R, the player can control Wanda, using her magic to deal with airborne enemies, while pressing L in certain contexts will make Cosmo transform Timmy into a certain object, such as a ball or a parade float.

Throughout each stage are stars, which serve as a standard collectable akin to the coins in the Super Mario series. Certain houses will contain an assortment of stars that the game challenges the player to collect within a time limit.

== Plot ==
=== Home Console versions ===
Timmy Turner eagerly awaits the season finale of one of his favorite shows--Crash Nebula—on TV. However, his TV stops working just as it premieres, and the only other time it can be seen is a day later when it reruns. He attempts to have Cosmo and Wanda fix it through a wish, but their wands aren't working.

When they arrive at Fairy World to figure out the issue, it is revealed by Jorgen von Strangle that the Royal Jewel, the second most powerful source of fairy magic in existence, has been stolen, meaning that wish-granting powers have been disabled on a massive scale. Timmy goes on a mission to try to find out who stole the Jewel and turn him in, so that all will be returned to normal. The first suspect is Quince, the royal jester in service of Oberon and Titania, the former rulers of Fairy World, who was recently fired for "not being funny."

After fighting Quince, Timmy has him interrogated by Jorgen, but it turns out that Quince did not have the Jewel, and the only way to get it back was by using the magic of the first-most-powerful source of magic: the famous Fairyversary Muffin.

To assemble the muffin, Timmy must bake it with magical forms of common cake ingredients, namely super strong hair raising flour, a phoenix egg, pixie sugar, and mooncalf milk. He somehow orders everything using the Internet, but Vicky snatches everything, and the ingredients are scattered in various places, such as in the possession of his parents or of Vicky herself (although the Phoenix Egg was destroyed). With the ingredients compromised, the trio must work to recover everything and put together the muffin before it's too late.

== Reception ==
Scores

Aggregate scores
| Aggregator | Score |
|---|---|
| GameRankings | PC(1 review): 75.0% PS2: 70.7% (8 reviews); GC(5 reviews): 65.0% GBA(2 reviews): 50.0% |
| Metacritic | (5 reviews) 61% |

Review score
| Publication | Score |
|---|---|
| IGN | 5/10 |

The PlayStation 2 and GameCube versions both received a score of 61 out of 100 on review aggregate site Metacritic, indicating "Mixed or Average Reviews".

Juan Castro of IGN rated the game a 5 out of 10, saying that it "squeaks by with bland, tired game mechanics and graphics that just don't hold up to today's gamer."
