= Largest empty sphere =

Problem in computational geometry

The dashed circle is the outline of the largest empty sphere in the close-packing of spheres. See also Interstitial defect.

Finding the largest empty circle using the Voronoi diagram (two solutions).

In computational geometry, the largest empty sphere problem is the problem of finding a hypersphere of largest radius in d-dimensional space whose interior does not overlap with any given obstacles.

== Two dimensions ==
The largest empty circle problem is the problem of finding a circle of largest radius in the plane whose interior does not overlap with any given obstacles.

A common special case is as follows. Given n points in the plane, find a largest circle centered within their convex hull and enclosing none of them. The problem may be solved using Voronoi diagrams in optimal time $\Theta(n\, \log\, n)$.

== See also ==
- Bounding sphere
- Farthest-first traversal
- Largest empty rectangle
