= Pipes (puzzle) =

Logic puzzle

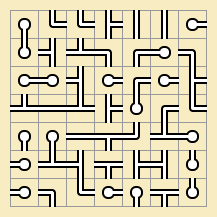
An unsolved Pipes puzzle.

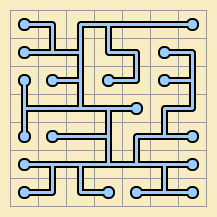
The same puzzle, solved. All pipes are connected.

Pipes, also known by the names FreeNet, Net, and NetWalk, is a logic puzzle where players can rotate tiles on a grid to form a complete network of pipes. The puzzle has appeared in standalone implementations, particularly in open source and web-based games.

== Rules ==
Pipes is typically played on a rectangular grid, where each tile on the grid consists of a "pipe" that can be rotated by multiples of 90°.

The objective of the puzzle is to rotate the tiles in such a way that all pipes are connected without any disconnected segments. The pipes should all form a single connected group, and there must not be closed loops.

== History ==
One of the earliest known implementations of this puzzle is the computer game KPlumber, which comes in standard packages of some Linux distributions. This game was ported to Windows in 2000, under the name Linkz.

In 2005, Simon Tatham created a Java applet of the game that can be played on the web, and called it Net. In the manual, he includes the following sentence:

I originally saw this in the form of a Flash game called FreeNet, written by Pavils Jurjans; there are several other implementations under the name NetWalk.

== Computational complexity ==
=== Solution algorithms ===
Pipes puzzles can be solved through brute-force, by going through all possible rotations of each tile in the grid and checking if it is a valid solution.

A faster algorithm may involve encoding the puzzle as a Boolean satisfiability problem (SAT), allowing it to be solved using a SAT solver. This algorithm may also be used to generate puzzles with a unique solution.

=== NP-completeness ===
Determining whether a Pipes instance has a solution is known to be NP-complete. This was proven by Král, et al. (2004), using a reduction from Planar 1-in-3-SAT, which is known to be NP-complete.

They also showed that if the puzzle does not contain any "straight line" tiles, then it becomes possible to solve it in polynomial time.

De Biasi (2012) provided a different NP-completeness proof by constructing a reduction from the Hamiltonian cycle problem.

== See also ==
- Pipe Mania
