= Axis-aligned object =

In geometry, an axis-aligned object (axis-parallel, axis-oriented) is an object in n-dimensional space whose shape is aligned with the coordinate axes of the space.

Examples are axis-aligned rectangles (or hyperrectangles), the ones with edges parallel to the coordinate axes. Minimum bounding boxes are often implicitly assumed to be axis-aligned. A more general case is rectilinear polygons, the ones with all sides parallel to coordinate axes or rectilinear polyhedra.

Many problems in computational geometry allow for faster algorithms when restricted to (collections of) axis-oriented objects, such as axis-aligned rectangles or axis-aligned line segments.

A different kind of example are axis-aligned ellipsoids, i.e., the ellipsoids with principal axes parallel to the coordinate axes.
