= Radiation effects from the Fukushima nuclear accident =

Effects of radiation released from the Fukushima nuclear accident

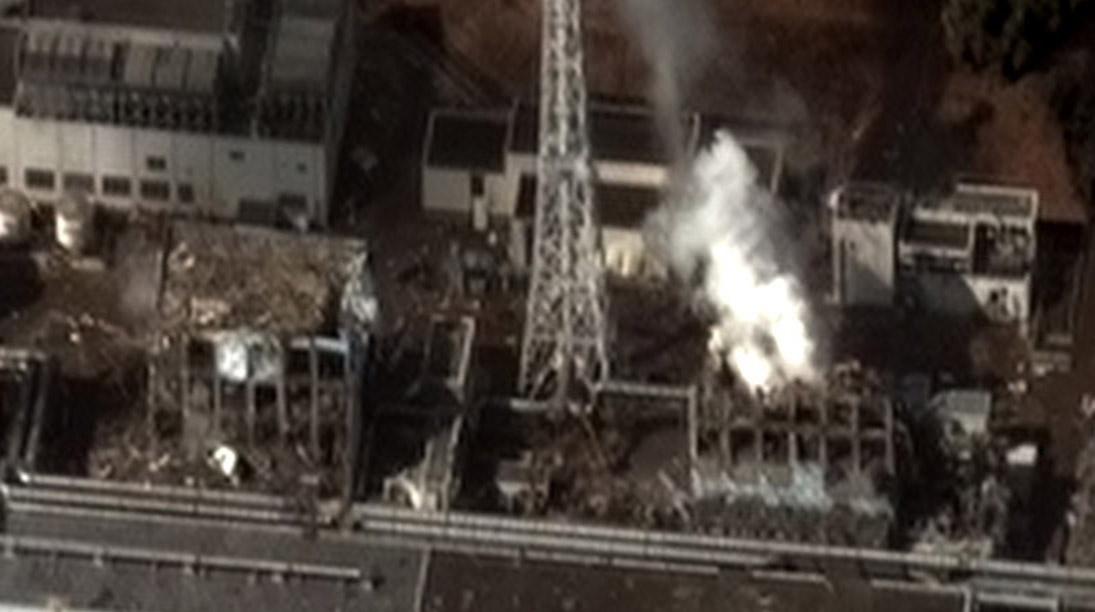
The 2011 Fukushima nuclear accident, the worst nuclear incident in 25 years, displaced 50,000 households after radioactive material leaked into the air, soil and sea. Radiation checks led to bans on some shipments of vegetables and fish.

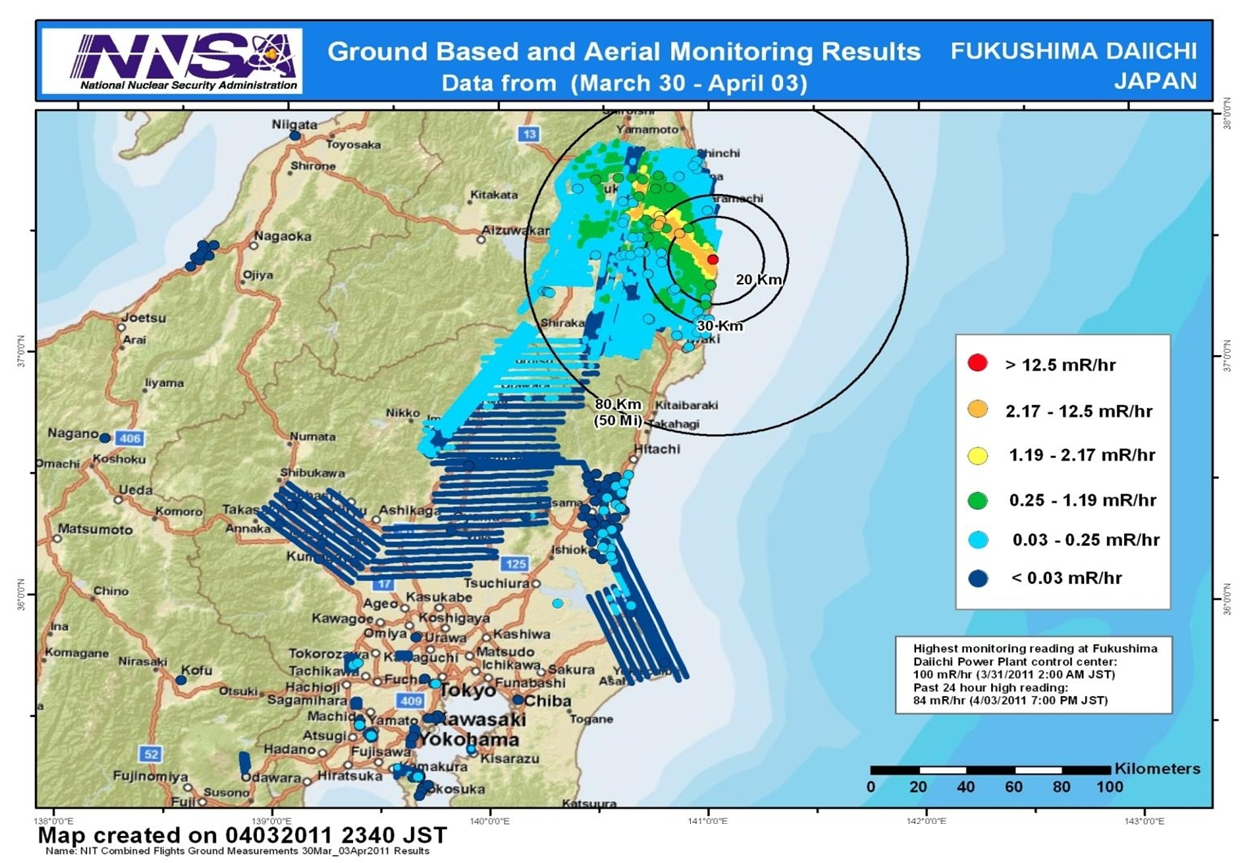
Map of contaminated areas around the plant (22 March – 3 April)

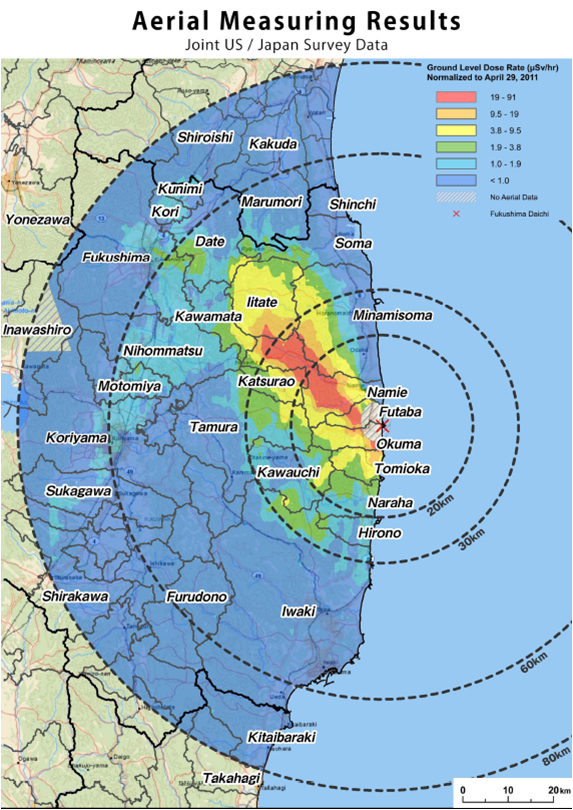
Map of detected radioactivity as of April 2011

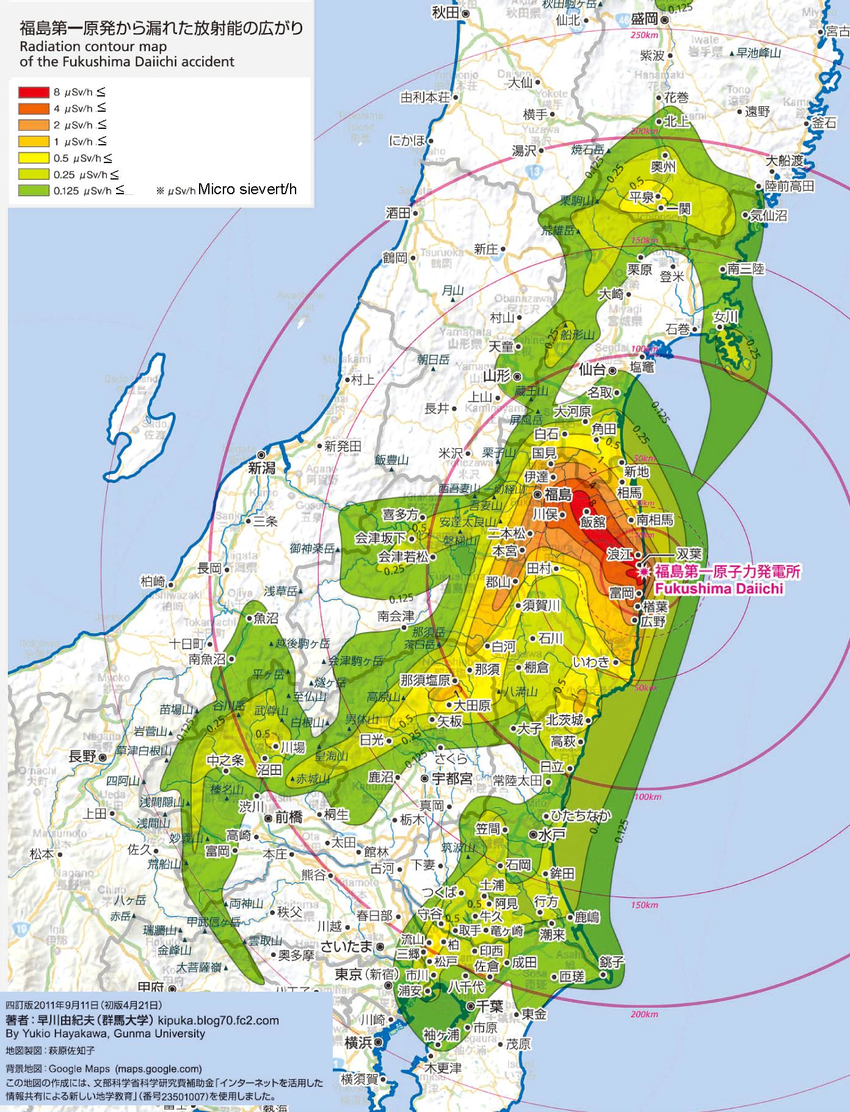
Map of detected radioactivity as of March 2012

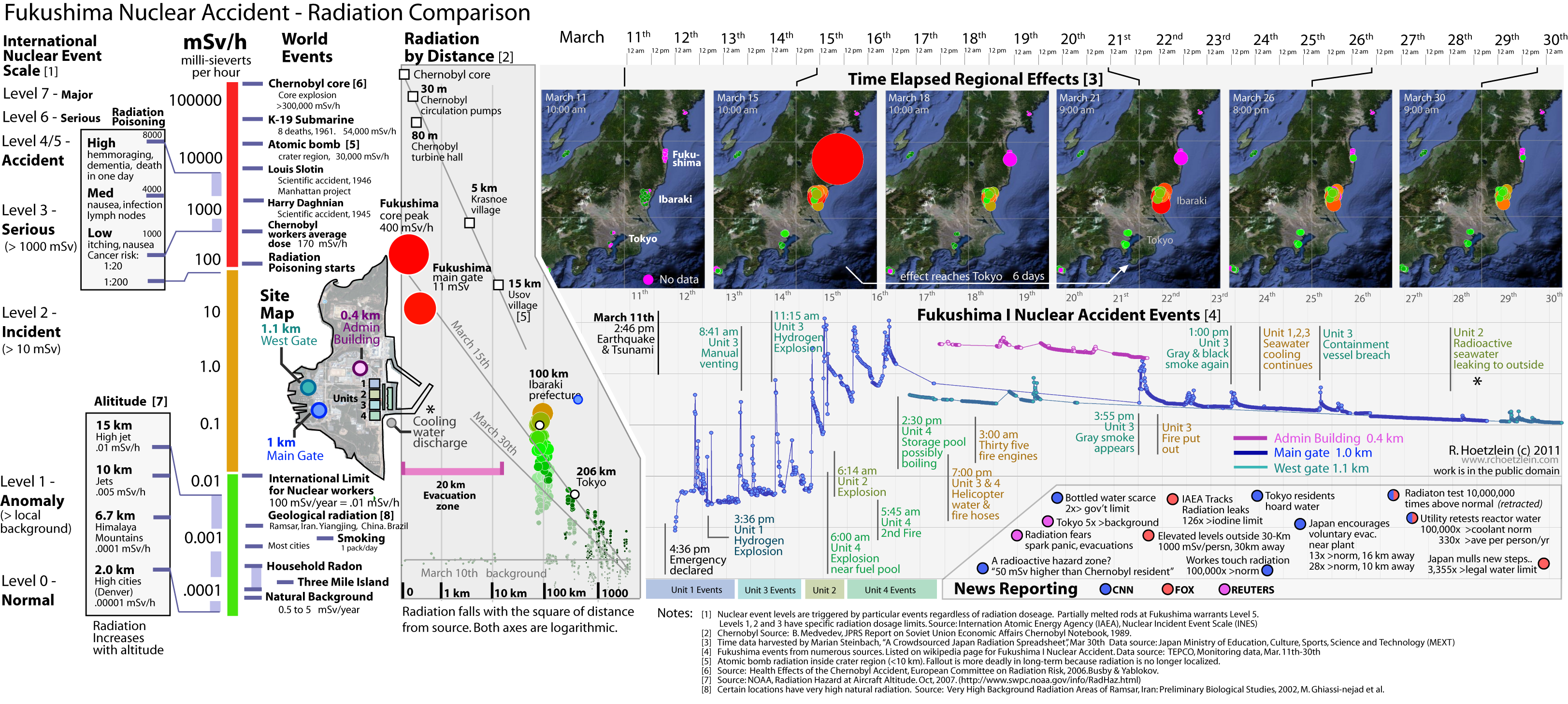
Fukushima dose rate comparison to other incidents and standards, with graph of recorded radiation levels and specific accident events from 11 to 30 March in 2011

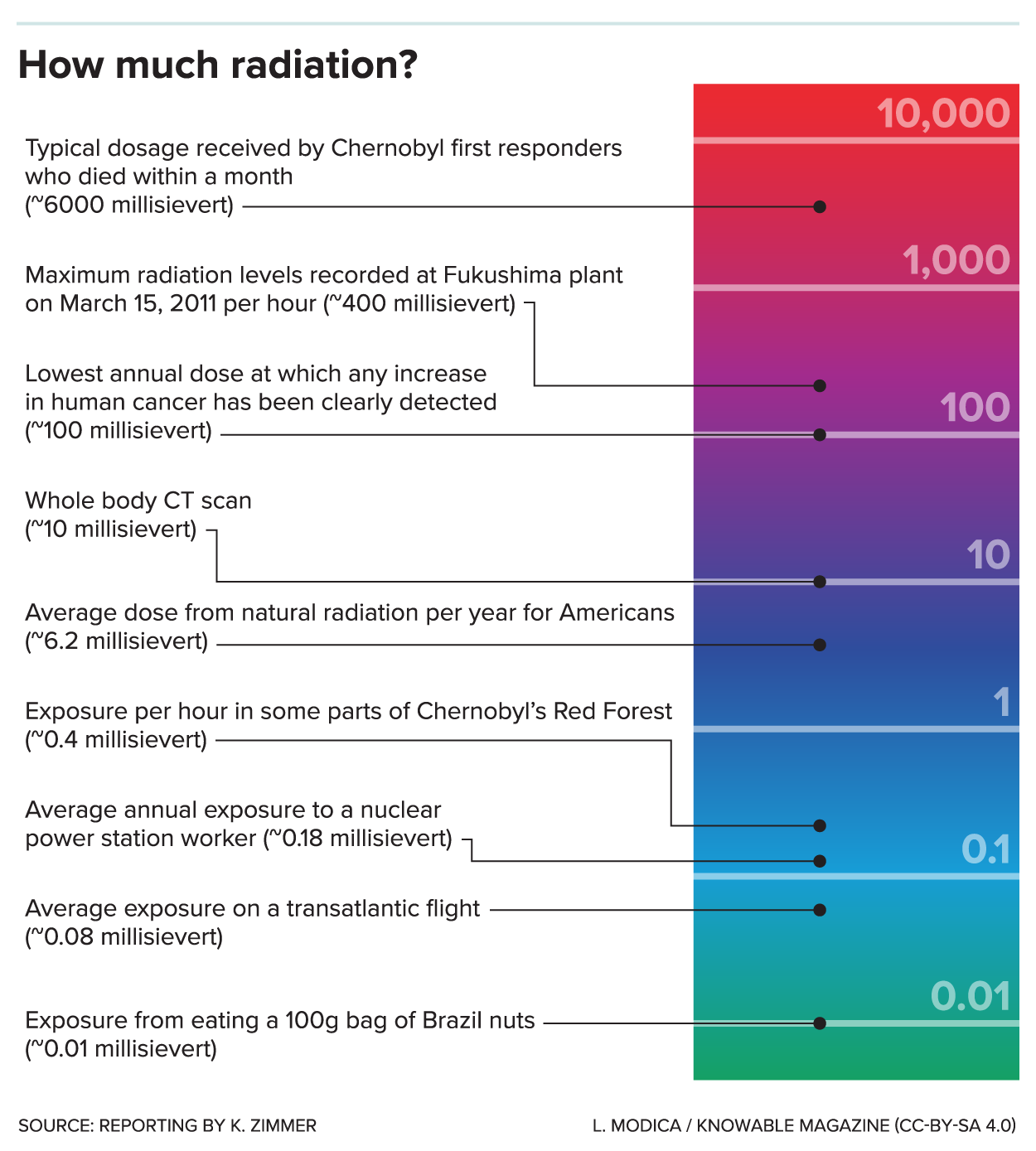
Maximum radiation level at Fukushima in comparison to a range of situations, from normal activities up to the Chernobyl reactor accident. Each step up the scale indicates a tenfold increase in radiation level

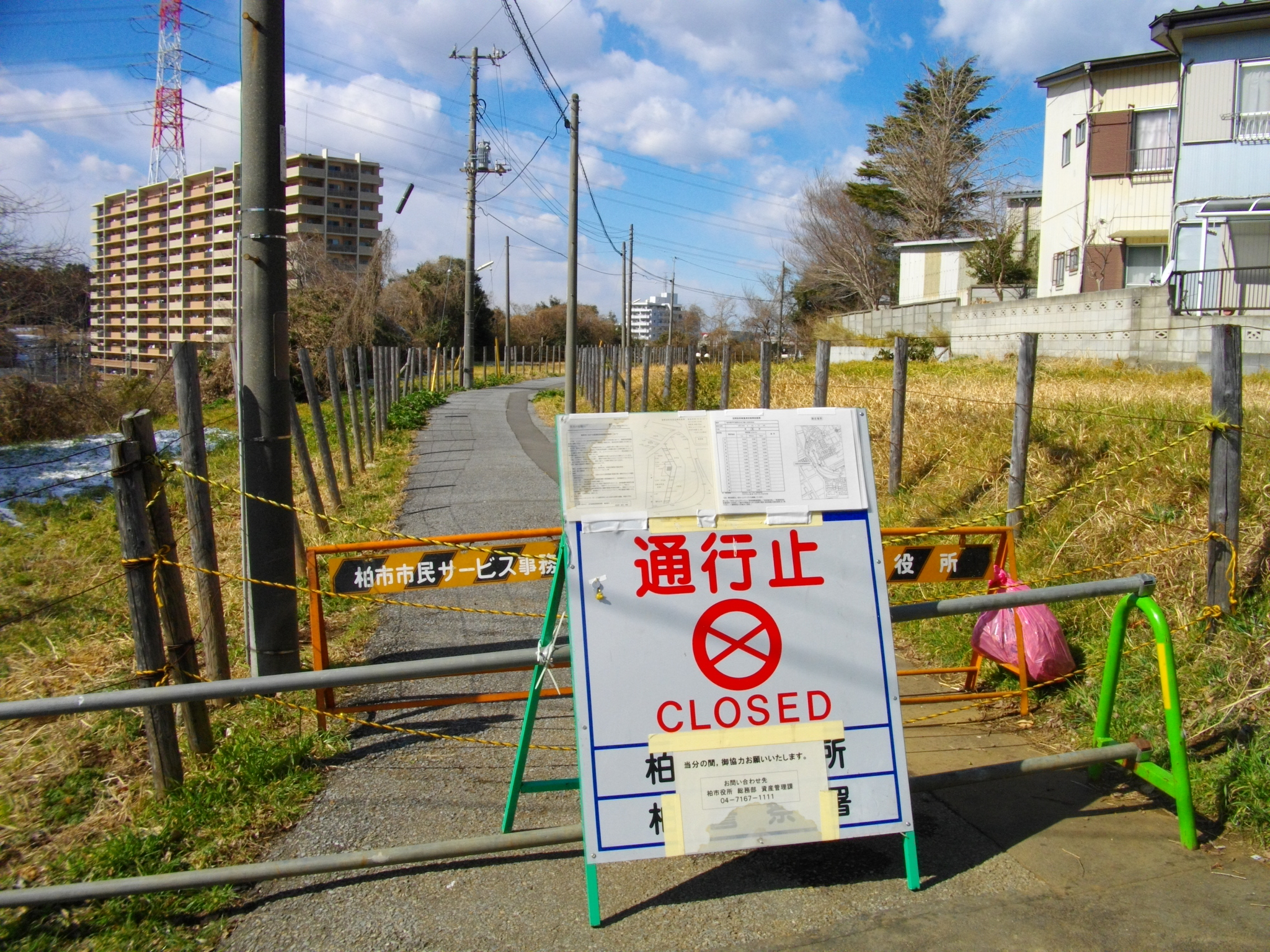
Radiation hotspot in Kashiwa, February 2012

The radiation effects from the Fukushima nuclear accident are the observed and predicted effects as a result of the release of radioactive isotopes from the Fukushima Daiichi Nuclear Power Plant following the 2011 Tōhoku earthquake and tsunami. The release of radioactive isotopes from reactor containment vessels was a result of venting in order to reduce gaseous pressure, and the discharge of coolant water into the sea. This resulted in Japanese authorities implementing a 30 km exclusion zone around the power plant and the continued displacement of approximately 156,000 people as of early 2013. The number of evacuees has declined to 49,492 as of March 2018. Radioactive particles from the incident, including iodine-131 and caesium-134/137, have since been detected at atmospheric radionuclide sampling stations around the world, including in California and the Pacific Ocean.

Preliminary dose-estimation reports by the World Health Organization (WHO) and the United Nations Scientific Committee on the Effects of Atomic Radiation (UNSCEAR) indicate that, outside the geographical areas most affected by radiation, even in locations within Fukushima Prefecture, the predicted risks remain low and no observable increases in cancer above natural variation in baseline rates are anticipated. In comparison, after the Chernobyl reactor accident, only 0.1% of the 110,000 cleanup workers surveyed have so far developed leukemia, although not all cases resulted from the accident. However, 167 Fukushima plant workers received radiation doses that slightly elevate their risk of developing cancer. Estimated effective doses from the accident outside of Japan are considered to be below, or far below the dose levels regarded as very small by the international radiological protection community. The United Nations Scientific Committee on the Effects of Atomic Radiation is expected to release a final report on the effects of radiation exposure from the accident by the end of 2013.

A June 2012 Stanford University study estimated, using a linear no-threshold model, that the radioactivity release from the Fukushima Daiichi nuclear plant could cause 130 deaths from cancer globally (the lower bound for the estimate being 15 and the upper bound 1100) and 199 cancer cases in total (the lower bound being 24 and the upper bound 1800), most of which are estimated to occur in Japan. Radiation exposure to workers at the plant was projected to result in 2 to 12 deaths. However, a December 2012 UNSCEAR statement to the Fukushima Ministerial Conference on Nuclear Safety advised that "because of the great uncertainties in risk estimates at very low doses, UNSCEAR does not recommend multiplying very low doses by large numbers of individuals to estimate numbers of radiation-induced health effects within a population exposed to incremental doses at levels equivalent to or lower than natural background levels."

== Health effects ==
Preliminary dose-estimation reports by the World Health Organization and the United Nations Scientific Committee on the Effects of Atomic Radiation indicate that 167 plant workers received radiation doses that slightly elevate their risk of developing cancer, but that this risk may not be statistically detectable, as has happened in the case of the Chernobyl disaster. After the Chernobyl accident, only 0.1% of the 110,000 cleanup workers surveyed have so far developed leukemia, although not all cases resulted from the accident Estimated effective doses from the Fukushima accident outside Japan are considered to be below (or far below) the dose levels regarded as very small by the international radiological protection community.

According to the Japanese Government, 180,592 people in the general population were screened in March 2011 for radiation exposure, and no case was found which affects health. Thirty workers conducting operations at the plant had exposure levels greater than 100 mSv. It is believed that the health effects of the radioactivity release are primarily psychological rather than physical effects. Even in the most severely affected areas, radiation doses never reached more than a quarter of the radiation dose linked to an increase in cancer risk (25 mSv, whereas 100 mSv has been linked to an increase in cancer rates among victims in Hiroshima and Nagasaki). However, people who have been evacuated have suffered from depression and other mental health effects.

While there were no deaths caused by radiation exposure, approximately 18,500 people died due to the earthquake and tsunami. Very few cancers would be expected as a result of the very low radiation doses received by the public. John Ten Hoeve and Stanford University professor Mark Z. Jacobson suggest that according to the linear no-threshold model (LNT) the accident is most likely to cause an eventual total of 130 (15–1100) cancer deaths, while noting that the validity of the LNT model at such low doses remains subject to debate. Radiation epidemiologist Roy Shore contends that estimating health effects in a population from the LNT model "is not wise because of the uncertainties". The LNT model did not accurately model casualties from Chernobyl, Hiroshima, or Nagasaki; it greatly overestimated the casualties. Evidence that the LNT model is a gross distortion of damage from radiation has existed since 1946 and was suppressed by Nobel Prize winner Hermann Müller in favour of assertions that no amount of radiation is safe.

Two years after the incident (in 2013), the World Health Organization (WHO) indicated that the residents of the area who were evacuated were exposed to little radiation and that radiation induced health impacts are likely to be below detectable levels. The health risks in the WHO assessment attributable to the Fukushima radioactivity release were calculated by largely applying the conservative Linear no-threshold model of radiation exposure, which assumes that even the smallest amount of radiation exposure has a negative health effect.

The WHO report released in 2013 predicts that for populations living around the Fukushima nuclear power plant there is a 70% higher relative risk of developing thyroid cancer for females exposed as infants, a 7% higher relative risk of leukemia in males exposed as infants, and a 6% higher relative risk of breast cancer in females exposed as infants. The WHO stresses that the percentages stated in that section of their report are relative risk increases of developing these cancers, not absolute risk increases, since the lifetime absolute baseline risk of developing thyroid cancer in females is 0.75% and the radiation-induced cancer risk is now predicted to increase that 0.75% to 1.25%, with this 0.75% to 1.25% change representing the "70% higher relative risk":

These percentages represent estimated relative increases over the baseline rates and are not absolute risks for developing such cancers. Due to the low baseline rates of thyroid cancer, even a large relative increase represents a small absolute increase in risks. For example, the baseline lifetime risk of thyroid cancer for females is just three-quarters of one percent [0.75%] and the additional lifetime risk estimated in this assessment for a female infant exposed in the most affected location is one-half of one percent [0.5%].

The WHO calculations determined that the most at-risk group, infants who were in the most affected area, would experience an absolute increase in the risk of cancer (of all types) during their lifetime of approximately one percent (1%) due to the accident. And the lifetime risk increase for thyroid cancer due to the accident for a female infant in the most affected radiation location was estimated to be one half of one percent (0.5%). Cancer risks for unborn children are considered to be similar to those for one-year-old infants.

The estimated risk of cancer to people who were children and adults during the Fukushima accident in the most affected area was determined to be lower than that of the most at-risk group—infants. A thyroid ultrasound screening programme was conducted in 2013 in the entire Fukushima Prefecture; this screening programme is, due to the screening effect, likely to record an increase in the incidence of thyroid disease due to early detection of non-symptomatic disease cases. About one-third of people (~30%) in industrialized nations are presently diagnosed with cancer during their lifetimes. Radiation exposure can increase cancer risk, with the cancers that arise being indistinguishable from cancers resulting from other causes.

In the general population, no increase is expected in the frequency of tissue reactions attributable to radiation exposure and no increase is expected in the incidence of congenital or developmental abnormalities, including cognitive impairment attributable to in-utero radiation exposure. No significant increase in heritable effects has been found in studies of the children of the survivors of the atomic bombings of Hiroshima and Nagasaki or in the offspring of cancer survivors treated with radiotherapy, which indicates that moderate acute radiation exposures have little impact on the overall risk of heritable effects in humans.

As of August 2013, there have been more than 40 children newly diagnosed with thyroid cancer and other cancers in Fukushima Prefecture. 18 of these were diagnosed with thyroid cancer, but these cancers are not attributed to radiation from Fukushima, as similar patterns occurred before the accident in 2006 in Japan, with 1 in 100,000 children per year developing thyroid cancer in that year, that is, this is not higher than the pre-accident rate. While controversial scientist Christopher Busby disagrees, claiming the rate of thyroid cancer in Japan was 0.0 children per 100,000 in 2005, the Japan Cancer Surveillance Research Group showed a thyroid cancer rate of 1.3 per 100,000 children in 2005 based on official cancer cases. As a point of comparison, thyroid cancer incidence rates after the Chernobyl accident of 1986 did not begin to increase above the prior baseline value of about 0.7 cases per 100,000 people per year until 1989 to 1991, 3 to 5 years after the accident in both the adolescent and children age groups. Therefore, data from Chernobyl suggests that an increase in thyroid cancer around Fukushima is not expected to begin to be seen until at least 3 to 5 years after the accident

According to the Tenth Report of the Fukushima Prefecture Health Management Survey released in February 2013, more than 40% of children screened around Fukushima Prefecture were diagnosed with thyroid nodules or cysts. Ultrasonographic detectable thyroid nodules and cysts are extremely common and can be found at a frequency of up to 67% in various studies. 186 (0.5%) of these had nodules larger than 5.1 mm and/or cysts larger than 20.1 mm and underwent further investigation. None had thyroid cancer. Fukushima Medical University gives the number of children diagnosed with thyroid cancer as of December 2013 as 33 and concluded, "[I]t is unlikely that these cancers were caused by the exposure from ^{131}I from the nuclear power plant accident in March 2011".

As part of the ongoing precautionary ultrasound screening program in and around Fukushima, (36%) of children in Fukushima Prefecture in 2012 were found to have thyroid nodules or cysts, but these are not considered abnormal. This screening programme is, due to the screening effect, likely, according to the WHO, to lead to an increase in the incidence of the diagnosis of thyroid disease due to early detection of non-symptomatic disease cases. The overwhelming majority of thyroid growths prior to the accident, and in other parts of the world, are overdiagnosed as needing treatment even though they will turn out to never cause any symptoms, illness, or death, even if nothing is ever done about the growth. Autopsy studies done prior to the accident and in other parts of the world, on people who died from other causes, show that more than one third of adults have a thyroid growth or cancer which never caused any harm.

A 2019 study evaluated the first and the second screening rounds of the Fukushima Health Management Survey (FHMS, 2011–2016) separately as well as combined covering 184 confirmed cancer cases in 1.080 million observed radiation-exposed person-years. The authors concluded "We suggest an innovative statistical technique to determine the municipality-specific average exposed person-time of the participants in the FHMS. The knowledge of the exposed person-time enables the assessment of the association between the radiation dose rate and the thyroid cancer detection rate more precisely than in previous studies. The thyroid cancer detection rate and the radiation dose-rate in the 59 municipalities in the Fukushima Prefecture show statistically significant dose-response relationships. The detection rate ratio per μSv/h was 1.065 (1.013, 1.119) based on all data in both examination rounds combined. In the 53 municipalities subjected to less than 2 μSv/h, the detection rate ratio was considerably higher: 1.555 (1.096, 2.206). Therefore, it became evident that the radiation contamination due to the Fukushima nuclear power plant accidents is positively associated with the thyroid cancer detection rate in children and adolescents. This corroborates previous studies providing evidence for a causal relation between nuclear accidents and the subsequent occurrence of thyroid cancer."

Thyroid cancer is one of the most survivable cancers, with an approximate 94% survival rate after first diagnosis, and that rate increases to a 100% survival rate with catching it early. For example, from 1989 to 2005, an excess of 4000 children and adolescent cases of thyroid cancer were observed in those who lived around Chernobyl; of these 4000 people, nine have died so far, a 99% survival rate.

In the 47 prefectures of Japan from 2012 onward, the annual proportion of low birth weight babies (< 2500 g) was associated with the prefecture-specific dose-rate derived from Cs-137 deposition after the nuclear power plant accidents. One μSv/h (equivalent to 8.8 mSv/year) increased the odds of observing a low birth weight baby by approximately 10%.

=== Psychological effects of perceived radiation exposure ===
A survey by the newspaper Mainichi Shimbun computed that there were 1,600 deaths related to the evacuation, comparable to the 1,599 deaths due to the earthquake and tsunami in the Fukushima Prefecture.

In the former Soviet Union, multiple patients with negligible radioactive exposure after the Chernobyl disaster displayed extreme anxiety about low level radiation exposure, and therefore developed a number of psychosomatic problems, including radiophobia, and with this an increase in fatalistic alcoholism being observed. As Japanese health and radiation specialist Shunichi Yamashita noted:

We know from Chernobyl that the psychological consequences are enormous. Life expectancy of the evacuees dropped from 65 to 58 years—not [predominantly] because of cancer, but because of depression, alcoholism and suicide. Relocation is not easy, the stress is very big. We must not only track those problems, but also treat them. Otherwise people will feel they are just guinea pigs in our research.

Findings from the Chernobyl disaster indicated the need for rigorous resource allocation, and research findings from Chernobyl were utilized in the Fukushima nuclear power plant disaster response. A survey by the Iitate, Fukushima local government obtained responses from approximately 1,743 people who have evacuated from the village, which lies within the emergency evacuation zone around the crippled Fukushima Daiichi Plant. It shows that multiple residents are experiencing growing frustration and instability due to the nuclear crisis and an inability to return to the lives they were living before the disaster. Sixty percent of respondents stated that their health and the health of their families had deteriorated after evacuating, while 39.9% reported feeling more irritated compared to before the disaster.

Summarizing all responses to questions related to evacuees' current family status, one-third of all surveyed families live apart from their children, while 50.1% live away from other family members (including elderly parents) with whom they lived before the disaster. The survey also showed that 34.7% of the evacuees have suffered salary cuts of 50% or more since the outbreak of the nuclear disaster. A total of 36.8% reported a lack of sleep, while 17.9% reported smoking or drinking more than before they evacuated.

Experts on the ground in Japan agree that mental health challenges are the most significant issue. Stress, such as that caused by dislocation, uncertainty, and concern about unseen toxicants, often manifests in physical ailments, such as heart disease. After a nuclear power plant disaster, residents of the affected areas are at a higher risk for mental health illnesses such as depression, anxiety, post-traumatic stress disorder (PTSD), medically unexplained somatic symptoms, and suicide. These mental health illnesses, among others, have been highly prevalent in the Fukushima residents following the nuclear power plant disaster.

Stressors that were identified as risk factors for these negative mental outcomes include: length of duration of evacuation, house damage, separation from family members, inability to family members and friends after the disaster, watching the earthquake on television, life-threatening experience during the quake and tsunamis, injury, plant explosion, unemployment among middle-aged men, burying loved ones themselves, lack of social support, pre-existing health problems, misunderstanding of radiation exposure risk, lack of clarity regarding benefits, on-going stigma regarding radiation, distrust of government, distrust of public health authorities, distrust of the Tokyo Electric Power Company (TEPCO) management, burnout among mental health workers, low income, loss of colleagues, and intra-family conflict. Poor mental health has been associated with early mortality, disability, and the overuse of medical services. The populations at the highest risk for mental health illnesses following the disaster are the nuclear power plant workers, mothers with infants, children, and middle-aged unemployed males.

At-risk populations were identified through the implementation of surveys such as the Fukushima Health Management Survey (FHMS). The FHMS began soon after the Fukushima disaster and has tracked health outcomes for several years after the event. The intent and goals of the FHMS surveys was to "monitor the long-term health of residents, promote their future well-being, and confirm whether long-term low-dose radiation exposure has health effects". The FHMS is a general survey that includes four detailed surveys (thyroid ultrasound exam, comprehensive health check, mental health and lifestyle survey, and pregnancy and birth survey). These surveys, which were given to both children and adults, addressed mental status, physical status, 6-month activities, perception of radiation risk, and experiences during and after disaster. The FHMS surveys are ongoing and are reported out on an annual basis.

According to the FHMS survey, the top three mental health diagnoses (discussed further below) include:

- Depression
- Anxiety
- Post-traumatic stress disorder

==== Depression ====
The disaster affected all ages of the population, and though adolescents were more likely to develop mental health problems in general, older adults were more likely to develop depression. For evacuees living in temporary housing, depression was more often long-term for these individuals when compared to the general population in Fukushima. Rates of depression were high among mothers who lived in Fukushima and were pregnant when the disaster occurred, and remained high in the months after the baby was born. Depressive symptoms occurred even more so in women who experienced interruption in obstetrical care because of the nuclear accident and potentially from damaged healthcare buildings. About a quarter of the women who were pregnant at the time of the disaster experienced symptoms of depression, and though the proportion of concerned expectant mothers decreased over time, counselling services were still provided in the years following due to the number of women concerned about the potential health effects from the event. Also, one study looking at elderly individuals from Iwanuma City in the Miyagi prefecture found that exercise may help decrease depressive symptoms among older adults who survived the earthquake and tsunami disaster.

==== Anxiety ====
One of the most common fears regarding nuclear accidents is radiation exposure. Parental anxiety was one of the reasons for thyroid ultrasound examinations in children after the disaster. In 2015, one study found that in a group of 300,473 children that had undergone a thyroid ultrasound since the Fukushima nuclear accident, nearly half of this sample had developed nodules or cysts; 116 children from this sample developed nodules that were malignant or otherwise suspicious.

Measures were taken to decrease the amount of radiation exposure due to side effects expected to potentially occur with exposure. For example, restrictions were placed on certain food from the region and internationally; Japanese goods were placed under restrictions by some countries initially after the disaster. Tough restrictions were left in place because the public generally did not have a clear idea of the risks from radiation exposure, and implementing policy changes to reflect less restrictive, but low-risk, levels of radiation received push-back in Japan.

Furthermore, those in the evacuation zone had to wait to return home, and some residents were unable to return home until several years after the event when living restrictions were finally lifted. However, lifting the living restrictions did not always help residents as most were uneasy about returning home due to fears of health hazards as well as the stability of the communities if they were to return home.

Low doses of radiation may not contribute much to create health effects like cancer, and given that such low doses may never lead to disease for most individuals, this raises the question of how evacuation should be handled in a situation like that of Fukushima. Ethical considerations need to be taken regarding the impact on mental health versus the costs of allowing low amounts of exposure. The multiple ways in which nuclear radiation could affect people in the area, whether through real health consequences or fear, are cause for anxiety; however, it appears that these fears may be settling in the Fukushima population as symptoms of anxiety have become less prevalent over time since the disaster.

==== PTSD ====
At least 10% of participants in studies following the Fukushima disaster developed PTSD. Among power plant workers from the event, it is possible that risk for post-traumatic stress disorder increased with age as younger workers tended not to develop this response as often as older workers. After the nuclear accident, stigmatization and discrimination were issues in general for nuclear power plant workers in the region whether they worked at the Daiichi plant or another plant that was not part of the nuclear accident. Greater amounts of discrimination and stressors in the first two to three months after the disaster were associated with general psychological distress and PTSD symptoms a year later, according to one study that assessed the mental health impact of slurs and discrimination on power plant workers. Like other mental health problems, the need for support for PTSD symptoms decreased over time; one study found that the percentage of Fukushima Prefecture adult participants needing support was 15.8% in 2013, a nearly 6% decrease compared to what was observed in 2011 after the disaster.

For all mental health needs, support services were provided soon after the disaster and in years following in order to help individuals suffering from symptoms of depression, anxiety, and PTSD; and it appears these services may have been worthwhile as symptoms of these mental health issues decreased in prevalence over time. Depression, anxiety, and PTSD were not the only notable mental health concerns that came out of the Fukushima nuclear accident. Other mental health issues that came out of the event include increased suicide risk.

==== Suicide ====
One of the most severe long-term effects the survey found is an increase in rates of suicide. In the first few years after the disaster, suicide rates decreased, but after 2013, there was a significant increase in the rate of suicide that surpassed the rate of suicide in the year before the disaster. The rate of suicide also increased more rapidly in Fukushima at this time than in surrounding prefectures that were affected by the earthquake and tsunami. There has been suggestion that support services may have helped cause the decrease in rate of suicide for the first few years after the disaster, and the relapse in 2014 may indicate further need for these resources. Overall, the FHMS survey and other research assisted with identifying the barriers to adequate mental health care.

The barriers identified to improving the mental health outcomes of Fukushima residents include: delays and miscommunication of benefits, a decline of health professionals assisting due to "burn out", rumors and public stigma of radiation, cultural stigma in Japan against mental health disorders (causing affected individuals to be less likely to seek assistance), distrust in authorities (i.e. government and healthcare professionals), and tension with the community health workers due to differences in perceptions of radiation risk. Based on these barriers, researchers were able to make recommendations for prevention and treatment of such mental health outcomes.

In order to effectively assist Fukushima residents and reduce the negative mental health outcomes, there needs to be further research to adequately identify the risk factors for mental health disorders. By doing so, efficient programs may be implemented. Programs (including mental health screenings), treatments, and resource distribution should be focused on high-risk groups immediately after the disaster, such as mothers and infants and nuclear power plant workers. Strategies that aim to reduce the incidence of the negative cultural stigma on mental health disorders in Japan should be implemented. Furthermore, researchers and policymakers should continue to monitor for long-term mental effects as they may not be present right away.

== Total emissions ==
On 24 May 2012, more than a year after the disaster, TEPCO released their estimate of radioactivity releases due to the Fukushima nuclear accident. An estimated 538.1 petabecquerels (PBq) of iodine-131, caesium-134 and caesium-137 was released. 520 PBq was released into the atmosphere between 12 and 31 March 2011 and 18.1 PBq into the ocean from 26 March to 30 September 2011. A total of 511 PBq of iodine-131 was released into both the atmosphere and the ocean, 13.5 PBq of caesium-134 and 13.6 PBq of caesium-137. In May 2012, TEPCO reported that at least 900 PBq had been released "into the atmosphere in March last year [2011] alone" up from previous estimates of 360–370 PBq total.

The primary releases of radioactive nuclides have been iodine and caesium; strontium and plutonium have also been found. These elements have been released into the air via steam; and into the water leaking into groundwater or the ocean. The expert who prepared a frequently cited Austrian Meteorological Service report asserted that the "Chernobyl accident emitted much more radioactivity and a wider diversity of radioactive elements than Fukushima Daiichi has so far, but it was iodine and caesium that caused most of the health risk – especially outside the immediate area of the Chernobyl plant." Iodine-131 has a half-life of 8 days while caesium-137 has a half-life of over 30 years. The IAEA has developed a method that weighs the "radiological equivalence" for different elements. TEPCO has published estimates using a simple-sum methodology, As of 25 April 2012 TEPCO has not released a total water and air release estimate.

According to a June 2011 report of the International Atomic Energy Agency (IAEA), at that time no confirmed long-term health effects to any person had been reported as a result of radiation exposure from the nuclear accident.

According to a report published by one expert in the Journal of Atomic research, the Japanese government claims that the release of radioactivity is about one-tenth of that from the Chernobyl disaster, and the contaminated area is also about one-tenth that of Chernobyl.

=== Air releases ===
A 12 April report prepared by NISA estimated the total release of iodine-131 was 130 PBq and caesium-137 at 6.1 PBq. On 23 April the NSC updated its release estimates, but it did not reestimate the total release, instead indicating that 154 TBq of air release were occurring daily as of 5 April.

On 24 August 2011, the Nuclear Safety Commission (NSC) of Japan published the results of the recalculation of the total amount of radioactive materials released into the air during the incident at the Fukushima Daiichi Nuclear Power Station. The total amounts released between 11 March and 5 April were revised downwards to 130 PBq for iodine-131 (I-131) and 11 PBq for caesium-137 (Cs-137). Earlier estimations were 150 PBq and 12 PBq.

On 20 September the Japanese government and TEPCO announced the installation of new filters at reactors 1, 2 and 3 to reduce the release of radioactive materials into the air. Gases from the reactors would be decontaminated before they would be released into the air. In the first half of September 2011 the amount of radioactive substances released from the plant was about 200 million becquerels per hour, according to TEPCO, which was approximately one-four millionths of the level of the initial stages of the accident in March.

According to TEPCO the emissions immediately after the accident were around 220 billion becquerel; readings declined after that, and in November and December 2011 they dropped to 17 thousand becquerel, about one-13 millionth the initial level. But in January 2012 due to human activities at the plant, the emissions rose again up to 19 thousand becquerel. Radioactive materials around reactor 2, where the surroundings were still highly contaminated, got stirred up by the workers going in and out of the building, when they inserted an optical endoscope into the containment vessel as a first step toward decommissioning the reactor.

==== Iodine-131 ====
A widely cited Austrian Meteorological Service report estimated the total amount of I-131 released into the air as of 19 March based on extrapolating data from several days of ideal observation at some of its worldwide CTBTO radionuclide measuring facilities (Freiburg, Germany; Stockholm, Sweden; Takasaki, Japan and Sacramento, USA) during the first 10 days of the accident. The report's estimates of total I-131 emissions based on these worldwide measuring stations ranged from 10 PBq to 700 PBq. This estimate was 1% to 40% of the 1760 PBq of the I-131 estimated to have been released at Chernobyl.

A later, 12 April 2011, NISA and NSC report estimated the total air release of iodine-131 at 130 PBq and 150 PBq, respectively – about 30 grams. However, on 23 April, the NSC revised its original estimates of iodine-131 released. The NSC did not estimate the total release size based upon these updated numbers, but estimated a release of 0.14 TBq per hour (0.00014 PBq/hr) on 5 April.

On 22 September the results were published of a survey conducted by the Japanese Science Ministry. This survey showed that radioactive iodine was spread northwest and south of the plant. Soil samples were taken at 2,200 locations, mostly in Fukushima Prefecture, in June and July, and with this a map was created of the radioactive contamination as of 14 June. Because of the short half-life of 8 days only 400 locations were still positive. This map showed that iodine-131 spread northwest of the plant, just like caesium-137 as indicated on an earlier map. But I-131 was also found south of the plant at relatively high levels, even higher than those of caesium-137 in coastal areas south of the plant. According to the ministry, clouds moving southwards apparently caught large amounts of iodine-131 that were emitted at the time. The survey was done to determine the risks for thyroid cancer within the population.

==== Tellurium-129m ====
On 31 October the Japanese ministry of Education, Culture, Sports, Science and Technology released a map showing the contamination of radioactive tellurium-129m within a 100-kilometer radius around the Fukushima No. 1 nuclear plant. The map displayed the concentrations found of tellurium-129m – a byproduct of uranium fission – in the soil at 14 June 2011. High concentrations were discovered northwest of the plant and also at 28 kilometers south near the coast, in the cities of Iwaki, Fukushima Prefecture, and Kitaibaraki, Ibaraki Prefecture. Iodine-131 was also found in the same areas, and most likely the tellurium was deposited at the same time as the iodine. The highest concentration found was 2.66 million becquerels per square meter, two kilometers from the plant in the empty town of Okuma. Tellurium-129m has a half-life of 33.6 days, so present levels are a very small fraction of the initial contamination. Tellurium has no biological functions, so even when drinks or food were contaminated with it, it would not accumulate in the body, like iodine in the thyroid gland.

==== Caesium-137 ====
On 24 March 2011, the Austrian Meteorological Service report estimated the total amount of caesium-137 released into the air as of 19 March based on extrapolating data from several days of ideal observation at a handful of worldwide CTBTO radionuclide measuring facilities. The agency estimated an average being 5 PBq daily. Over the course of the disaster, Chernobyl put out a total of 85 PBq of caesium-137. However, later reporting on 12 April estimated total caesium releases at 6.1 PBq to 12 PBq, respectively by NISA and NSC – about 2–4 kg. On 23 April, NSC updated this number to 0.14 TBq per hour of caesium-137 on 5 April, but did not recalculate the entire release estimate.

==== Strontium-90 ====
On 12 October 2011 a concentration of 195 becquerels/kilogram of Strontium-90 was found in the sediment on the roof of an apartment building in the city of Yokohama, south of Tokyo, some 250 km from the plant in Fukushima. This first find of strontium above 100 becquerels per kilogram raised serious concerns that leaked radioactivity might have spread far further than the Japanese government expected. The find was done by a private agency that conducted the test upon the request of a resident. After this find Yokohama city started an investigation of soil samples collected from areas near the building. The science ministry said that the source of the Strontium was still unclear.

==== Plutonium isotopes ====
On 30 September 2011, the Japanese Ministry of Education and Science published the results of a plutonium fallout survey, for which in June and July 50 soil samples were collected from a radius of slightly more than 80 km around the Fukushima Daiichi plant. Plutonium was found in all samples, which is to be expected since plutonium from the nuclear weapon tests of the 1950s and '60s is found everywhere on the planet. The highest levels found (of Pu-239 and Pu-240 combined) were 15 becquerels per square meters in Fukushima Prefecture and 9.4 Bq in Ibaraki prefecture, compared to a global average of 0.4 to 3.7 Bq/kg from atomic bomb tests. Earlier in June, university researchers detected smaller amounts of plutonium in soil outside the plant after they collected samples during filming by NHK.

A recent study published in Nature found up to 35 bq/kg plutonium 241 in leaf litter in 3 out of 19 sites in the most contaminated zone in Fukushima. They estimated the Pu-241 dose for a person living for 50 years in the vicinity of the most contaminated site to be 0.44 mSv. However, the Cs-137 activity at the sites where Pu-241 was found was very high (up to 4.7 MBq/kg or about 135,000 times greater than the plutonium 241 activity), which suggests that it will be the Cs-137 which prevents habitation rather than the relatively small amounts of plutonium of any isotope in these areas.

=== Water releases ===
Discharge of radioactive water of the Fukushima Daiichi Nuclear Power Plant began in April 2011. On 21 April, TEPCO estimated that 520 tons of radioactive water leaked into the sea before leaks in a pit in unit 2 were plugged, totaling 4.7 PBq of water release (calculated by simple sum, which is inconsistent with the IAEA methodology for mixed-nuclide releases) (20,000 times facility's annual limit). TEPCO's detailed estimates were 2.8 PBq of I-131, 0.94 PBq of Cs-134, 0.940 PBq of Cs-137.

Another 300,000 tons of relatively less-radioactive water had already been reported to have leaked or been purposefully pumped into the sea to free room for storage of highly radioactively contaminated water. TEPCO had attempted to contain contaminated water in the harbor near the plant by installing "curtains" to prevent outflow, but now believes this effort was unsuccessful.

According to a report published in October 2011 by the French Institute for Radiological Protection and Nuclear Safety, between 21 March and mid-July around 2.7 × 10^{16} Bq of caesium-137 (about 8.4 kg) entered the ocean, about 82 percent having flowed into the sea before 8 April. This emission of radioactivity into the sea represents the most important individual emission of artificial radioactivity into the sea ever observed. However, the Fukushima coast has some of the world's strongest currents and these transported the contaminated waters far into the Pacific Ocean, thus causing dispersion of the radioactive elements. The results of measurements of both the seawater and the coastal sediments led to the supposition that the consequences of the accident, in terms of radioactivity, would be minor for marine life as of autumn 2011 (weak concentration of radioactivity in the water and limited accumulation in sediments). On the other hand, significant pollution of sea water along the coast near the nuclear plant might persist, because of the continuing arrival of radioactive material transported towards the sea by surface water running over contaminated soil. Further, some coastal areas might have less-favorable dilution or sedimentation characteristics than those observed so far. Finally, the possible presence of other persistent radioactive substances, such as strontium-90 or plutonium, has not been sufficiently studied. Recent measurements show persistent contamination of some marine species (mostly fish) caught along the coast of Fukushima district. Organisms that filter water and fish at the top of the food chain are, over time, the most sensitive to caesium pollution. It is thus justified to maintain surveillance of marine life that is fished in the coastal waters off Fukushima. Despite caesium isotopic concentration in the waters off of Japan being 10 to 1000 times above concentration prior to the accident, radiation risks are below what is generally considered harmful to marine animals and human consumers.

A year after the disaster, in April 2012, sea fish caught near the Fukushima power plant still contain as much radioactive ^{134}Cs and ^{137}Cs compared to fish caught in the days after the disaster. At the end of October 2012 TEPCO admitted that it could not exclude radioactivity releases into the ocean, although the radiation levels were stabilised. Undetected leaks into the ocean from the reactors, could not be ruled out, because their basements remain flooded with cooling water, and the 2,400-foot-long steel and concrete wall between the site's reactors and the ocean, that should reach 100 feet underground, was still under construction, and would not be finished before mid-2014. Around August 2012 two greenling were caught close to the Fukushima shore, they contained more than 25 kBq per kilogram of caesium, the highest caesium levels found in fish since the disaster and 250 times the government's safety limit.

In August 2013, a Nuclear Regulatory Authority task force reported that contaminated groundwater had breached an underground barrier, was rising toward the surface and exceeded legal limits of radioactive discharge. The underground barrier was only effective in solidifying the ground at least 1.8 meters below the surface, and water began seeping through shallow areas of earth into the sea.

== Radiation at the plant site ==
Normal radiation dose rates at the Fukushima I site as established by the stream of monitoring post readings in the 3 months preceding the accident. (03/01=1 March 2011, 1 Gray= 1 Sv for gamma radiation)

Radiation fluctuated widely on the site after the tsunami and often correlated to fires and explosions on site. Radiation dose rates at one location between reactor units 3 and 4 was measured at 400 mSv/h at 10:22 JST, 13 March, causing experts to urge rapid rotation of emergency crews as a method of limiting exposure to radiation. Dose rates of 1,000 mSv/h were reported (but not confirmed by the IAEA) close to the certain reactor units on 16 March, prompting a temporary evacuation of plant workers, with radiation levels subsequently dropping back to 800–600 mSv/h. At times, radiation monitoring was hampered by a belief that some radiation levels may be higher than 1 Sv/h, but that "authorities say 1,000 millisieverts [per hour] is the upper limit of their measuring devices."

=== Exposure of workers ===
Prior to the accident, the maximum permissible dose for Japanese nuclear workers was 100 mSv per year, but on 15 March 2011, the Japanese Health and Labor Ministry increased that annual limit to 250 mSv, for emergency situations. This level is below the 500 mSv/year considered acceptable for emergency work by the World Health Organization. Some contract companies working for TEPCO have opted not to use the higher limit. On 15 March, TEPCO decided to work with a skeleton crew (in the media called the Fukushima 50) in order to minimize the number of people exposed to radiation.

On 17 March, IAEA reported 17 persons to have suffered deposition of radioactive material on their face; the levels of exposure were too low to warrant hospital treatment. On 22 March, World Nuclear News reported that one worker had received over 100 mSv during "venting work" at Unit 3. An additional 6 had received over 100 mSv, of which for 1 a level of over 150 mSv was reported for unspecified activities on site. On 24 March, three workers were exposed to high levels of radiation which caused two of them to require hospital treatment after radioactive water seeped through their protective clothes while working in unit 3. Based on the dosimeter values, exposures of 170 mSv were estimated, the injuries indicated exposure to 2000 to 6000 mSv around their ankles. They were not wearing protective boots, as their employing firm's safety manuals "did not assume a scenario in which its employees would carry out work standing in water at a nuclear power plant". The amount of the radioactivity of the water was about 3.9 M Bq per cubic centimetre.

As of 24 March 19:30 (JST), 17 workers (of which 14 were from plant operator TEPCO) had been exposed to levels of over 100 mSv. By 29 March, the number of workers reported to have been exposed to levels of over 100 mSv had increased to 19. An American physician reported Japanese doctors have considered banking blood for future treatment of workers exposed to radiation. TEPCO has started a re-assessment of the approximately 8300 workers and emergency personnel who have been involved in responding to the incident, which has revealed that by 13 July, of the approximately 6700 personnel tested so far, 88 personnel have received between 100 and 150 mSv, 14 have received between 150 and 200 mSv, 3 have received between 200 and 250 mSv, and 6 have received above 250 mSv.

TEPCO has been criticized in its provision of safety equipment for its workers. After NISA warned TEPCO that workers were sharing dosimeters, since most of the devices were lost in the disaster, the utility sent more to the plant. Japanese media has reported that workers indicate that standard decontamination procedures are not being observed. Others reports suggest that contract workers are given more dangerous work than TEPCO employees. TEPCO is also seeking workers willing to risk high radiation levels for short periods of time in exchange for high pay. Confidential documents acquired by the Japanese Asahi newspaper suggest that TEPCO hid high levels of radioactive contamination from employees in the days following the incident. In particular, the Asahi reported that radiation levels of 300 mSv/h were detected at least twice on 13 March, but that "the workers who were trying to bring the disaster under control at the plant were not informed of the levels."

Workers on-site now wear full-body radiation protection gear, including masks and helmets covering their entire heads, but it means they have another enemy: heat. As of 19 July 2011, 33 cases of heat stroke had been recorded. In these harsh working conditions, two workers in their 60s died from heart failure.

==== Iodine-intake ====
On 19 July 2013 TEPCO said that 1,973 employees would have a thyroid-radiation dose exceeding 100 millisieverts. 19,592 workers—3,290 TEPCO employees and 16,302 employees of contractor firms—were given health checks. The radiation doses were checked from 522 workers. Those were reported to the World Health Organization in February 2013. From this sample, 178 had experienced a dose of 100 millisieverts or more. After the U.N. Scientific Committee on the Effects of Atomic Radiation, questioned the reliability of TEPCO's thyroid gland dosage readings, the Japanese Health Ministry ordered TEPCO to review the internal dosage readings.

The intake of radioactive iodine was calculated based on the radioactive caesium intake and other factors: the airborne iodine-to-caesium ratio on the days that the people worked at the reactor compound and other data. For one worker a reading was found of more than 1,000 millisieverts.

According to the workers, TEPCO did little to inform them about the hazards of the intake of radioactive iodine. All workers with an estimated dose of 100 millisieverts were offered an annual ultrasound thyroid test during their lifetime for free. But TEPCO did not know how many of these people had received a medical screening already. A schedule for the thyroid gland test was not announced. TEPCO did not indicate what would be done if abnormalities were spotted during the tests.

=== Radiation within the primary containment of the reactors ===
Within the primary containment of reactors 1, 2, 3 and 4, widely varying levels of radiation were reported:

time (JST)	Reactor 1 (Sv/h)		Reactor 2 (Sv/h)		Reactor 3 (Sv/h)	
time (JST)	Dry Well	Wet Well (torus)	Dry Well	Wet Well (torus)	Dry Well	Wet Well (torus)
2011-03-17, 12:50	0.00410	31.6	84.4	2.43	---	---
2011-03-18, 7:55–12:35	0.00375	46.9	78.0	2.37	105	5.90
2011-03-20, 15:00–16:00	12.0	40.0	0.625	2.13	71.7	2.00
2011-03-23, 9:10–14:20	48.0	29.9	50.7	1.67	60.2	1.74
2011-03-24, 17:00	40.9	25.8	47.4	1.36	53.3	1.45
2011-03-25, 10:00	38.9	24.9	45.6	1.54	51.0	1.50
2011-03-25, 14:00–16:30	37.1	24.5	45.2	1.54	38.8	1.31
2011-03-26, 9:30–10:00	35.1	23.6	43.4	1.49	36.1	1.40

=== Radiation outside primary containment of the reactors ===
Outside the primary containment, plant radiation-level measurements have also varied significantly.

On 25 March, an analysis of stagnant water in the basement floor of the turbine building of Unit 1 showed heavy contamination.

Nuclide	Concentration (Bq/mL)
^{38}Cl	1.6×10^{6}
^{74}As	3.9×10^{2}
^{91}Y	5.2×10^{4}
^{131}I	2.1×10^{5}
^{134}Cs	1.6×10^{5}
^{136}Cs	1.7×10^{4}
^{137}Cs	1.8×10^{6}
^{140}La	3.4×10^{2}

On 27 March, TEPCO reported stagnant water in the basement of unit 2 (inside the reactor/turbine building complex, but outside the primary containment) was measured at 1000 mSv/h or more, which prompted evacuation. The exact dose rate remains unknown as the technicians fled the place after their first measurement went off-scale. Additional basement and trench-area measurements indicated 60 mSv/h in unit 1, "over 1000" mSv/h in unit 2, and 750 mSv/h in unit 3. The report indicated the main source was iodine-134 with a half-life of less than an hour, which resulted in a radioactive iodine concentration 10 million times the normal value in the reactor. TEPCO later retracted its report, stating that the measurements were inaccurate and attributed the error to comparing the isotope responsible, iodine-134, to normal levels of another isotope. Measurements were then corrected, stating that the iodine levels were 100,000 times the normal level. On 28 March, the erroneous radiation measurement caused TEPCO to reevaluate the software used in analysis.

Measurements within the reactor/turbine buildings, but not in the basement and trench areas, were made on 18 April. These robotic measurements indicated up to 49 mSv/h in unit 1 and 57 mSv/h in unit 3. This is substantially lower than the basement and trench readings, but still exceeds safe working levels without constant worker rotation. Inside primary containment, levels are much higher.

By 23 March 2011, neutron radiation had been observed outside the reactors 13 times at the Fukushima I site. While this could indicate ongoing fission, a recriticality event was not believed to account for these readings. Based on those readings and TEPCO reports of high levels of chlorine-38, Dr. Ferenc Dalnoki-Veress speculated that transient criticalities may have occurred. However, Edwin Lyman at the Union of Concerned Scientists was skeptical, believing the reports of chlorine-38 to be in error. TEPCO's chlorine-38 report was later retracted. Noting that limited, uncontrolled chain reactions might occur at Fukushima I, a spokesman for the International Atomic Energy Agency (IAEA) "emphasized that the nuclear reactors won't explode."

On 15 April, TEPCO reported that nuclear fuel had melted and fallen to the lower containment sections of three of the Fukushima I reactors, including reactor three. The melted material was not expected to breach one of the lower containers, causing a serious radioactivity release. Instead, the melted fuel was thought to have dispersed uniformly across the lower portions of the containers of reactors No. 1, No. 2 and No. 3, making the resumption of the fission process, known as a "recriticality," most unlikely.

On 19 April, TEPCO estimated that the unit-2 turbine basement contained 25,000 cubic meters of contaminated water. The water was measured to have 3 MBq/cm3 of Cs-137 and 13 MBq/cm3 of I-131: TEPCO characterized this level of contamination as "extremely high." To attempt to prevent leakage to the sea, TEPCO planned to pump the water from the basement to the Centralized Radiation Waste Treatment Facility.

A suspected hole from the melting of fuel in unit 1 has allowed water to leak in an unknown path from unit 1 which has exhibited radiation measurements "as high as 1,120 mSv/h." Radioactivity measurements of the water in the unit-3 spent-fuel pool were reported at 140 kBq of radioactive caesium-134 per cubic centimeter, 150 kBq of caesium-137 per cubic centimeter, and 11 kBq per cubic centimeter of iodine-131 on 10 May.

=== Site contamination ===
==== Soil ====
TEPCO have reported at three sites 500 meters from the reactors that the caesium-134 and caesium-137 levels in the soil are between 7.1 kBq and 530 kBq per kilo of undried soil.

Small traces of plutonium have been found in the soil near the stricken reactors: repeated examinations of the soil suggest that the plutonium level is similar to the background level caused by atomic bomb tests. As the isotope signature of the plutonium is closer to that of power-reactor plutonium, TEPCO suggested that "two samples out of five may be the direct result of the recent incident." The more important thing to look at is the curium level in the soil; the soil does contain a short-lived isotope (curium-242) which shows that some alpha emitters have been released in small amounts by the accident. The release of the beta/gamma emitters such as caesium-137 has been far greater. In the short and medium term the effects of the iodine and the caesium release will dominate the effect of the accident on farming and the general public. In common with almost all soils, the soil at the reactor site contains uranium, but the concentration of uranium and the isotope signature suggests that the uranium is the normal, natural uranium in the soil.

Radioactive strontium-89 and strontium-90 were discovered in soil at the plant on 18 April, amounts detected in soil one-half kilometer from the facility ranging from 3.4 to 4400 Bq/kg of dry soil. Strontium remains in soil from above-ground nuclear testing; however, the amounts measured at the facility are approximately 130 times greater than the amount typically associated with previous nuclear testing.

The isotope signature of the release looks very different from that of the Chernobyl accident: the Japanese accident has released much less of the involatile plutonium, minor actinides and fission products than Chernobyl did.

On 31 March, TEPCO reported that it had measured radioactivity in the plant-site groundwater which was 10,000 times the government limit. The company did not think that this radioactivity had spread to drinking water. NISA questioned the radioactivity measurement and TEPCO is re-evaluating it. Some debris around the plant has been found to be highly radioactive, including a concrete fragment emanating 900 mSv/h.

==== Air and direct radiation ====
Air outside, but near, unit 3 was reported at 70 mSv/h on 26 April 2011. This was down from radiation levels as high as 130 mSv/h near units 1 and 3 in late March. Removal of debris reduced the radiation measurements from localized highs of up to 900 mSv/h to less than 100 mSv/h at all exterior locations near the reactors; however, readings of 160 mSv/h were still measured at the waste-treatment facility.

=== Discharge to seawater and contaminated sealife ===
Results revealed on 22 March from a sample taken by TEPCO about 100 m south of the discharge channel of units 1–4 showed elevated levels of Cs-137, caesium-134 (Cs-134) and I-131. A sample of seawater taken on 22 March 330 m south of the discharge channel (30 kilometers off the coastline) had elevated levels of I-131 and Cs-137. Also, north of the plant elevated levels of these isotopes were found on 22 March (as well as Cs-134, tellurium-129 and tellurium-129m (Te-129m)), although the levels were lower. Samples taken on 23 and/or 24 March contained about 80 Bq/mL of iodine-131 (1850 times the statutory limit) and 26 Bq/mL and caesium-137, most likely caused by atmospheric deposition. By 26 and 27 March this level had decreased to 50 Bq/mL (11) iodine-131 and 7 Bq/mL (2.9) caesium-137 (80 times the limit). Hidehiko Nishiyama, a senior NISA official, stated that radionuclide contamination would "be very diluted by the time it gets consumed by fish and seaweed." Above the seawater, IAEA reported "consistently low" dose rates of 0.04–0.1 μSv/h on 27 March.

By 29 March iodine-131 levels in seawater 330 m south of a key discharge outlet had reached 138 Bq/mL (3,355 times the legal limit), and by 30 March, iodine-131 concentrations had reached 180 Bq/mL at the same location near the Fukushima Daiichi nuclear plant, 4,385 times the legal limit. The high levels could be linked to a feared overflow of highly radioactive water that appeared to have leaked from the unit -2 turbine building. On 15 April, I-131 levels were 6,500 times the legal limits. On 16 April, TEPCO began dumping zeolite, a mineral "that absorbs radioactive substances, aiming to slow down contamination of the ocean."

Seawater radionuclide concentration on 29 March 2011:

Nuclide	Concentration (Bq/cm^{3})	Regulatory limit (Bq/cm^{3})	Concentration / Regulatory Limit
^{99m}Tc	0.16	40	.0004
^{131}I	130	0.04	3250
^{134}Cs	31	0.06	517
^{136}Cs	2.8	0.3	9.3
^{137}Cs	32	0.09	356
^{140}Ba	5.0	0.3	17
^{140}La	2.5	0.4	6.3

On 4 April, it was reported that the "operators of Japan's crippled power plant say they will release more than 10,000 tons of contaminated water into the ocean to make room in their storage tanks for water that is even more radioactive." Measurements taken on 21 April indicated 186 Bq/L measured 34 km from the Fukushima plant; Japanese media reported this level of seawater contamination second to the Sellafield nuclear accident.

On 11 May, TEPCO announced it believed it had sealed a leak from unit 3 to the sea; TEPCO did not immediately announce the amount of radioactivity released by the leak. On 13 May, Greenpeace announced that 10 of the 22 seaweed samples it had collected near the plant showed 10,000 Bq/Kg or higher, five times the Japanese standard for food of 2 kBq/kg for iodine-131 and 500 Bq/kg for radioactive caesium.

In addition to the large releases of contaminated water (520 tons and 4.7 PBq) believed to have leaked from unit 2 from mid-March until early April, another release of radioactive water is believed to have contaminated the sea from unit 3, because on 16 May TEPCO announced seawater measurements of 200 Bq per cubic centimeter of caesium-134, 220 Bq per cubic centimeter of caesium-137, and unspecified high levels of iodine shortly after discovering a unit-3 leak.

At two locations 20 kilometers north and south and 3 kilometers from the coast, TEPCO found strontium-89 and strontium-90 in the seabed soil. The samples were taken on 2 June. Up to 44 becquerels per kilogram of strontium-90 were detected, which has a half-life of 29 years. These isotopes were also found in soil and in seawater immediately after the accident. Samples taken from fish and seafood caught off the coast of Ibaraki and Chiba did not contain radioactive strontium.

As of October 2012, regular sampling of fish and other sea life off the coast of Fukushima showed that total caesium levels in bottom-dwelling fish were higher off Fukushima than elsewhere, with levels above regulatory limits, leading to a fishing ban for some species. Caesium levels had not decreased 1 year after the accident.

Continuous monitoring of radioactivity levels in seafood by the Japanese Ministry of Agriculture, Forestry and Fisheries (MAFF) shows that for the Fukushima Prefecture the proportion of catches which exceed Japanese safety standards has been decreasing continuously, falling below 2% in the second half of 2013 and below 0.5% in the fourth quarter of 2014. None of the fish caught in 2014 exceeded the less stringent pre-Fukushima standards. For the rest of Japan, the peak figure using the post-Fukushima standards was 4.7% immediately after the catastrophe, falling below 0.5% by mid-2012, and below 0.1% by mid-2013.

In February 2014, NHK reported that TEPCO was reviewing its radioactivity data, after finding much higher levels of radioactivity than was reported earlier. TEPCO now says that levels of 5 MBq of strontium per liter were detected in groundwater collected in July 2013 and not 0.9 MBq, as initially reported.

== Radiation and nuclide detection in Japan ==
Periodic overall reports of the situation in Japan are provided by the United States Department of Energy.

In April 2011, the United States Department of Energy published projections of the radiation risks over the next year (that is, for the future) for people living in the neighborhood of the plant. Potential exposure could exceed 20 mSv/year (2 rems/year) in some areas up to 50 kilometers from the plant. That is the level at which relocation would be considered in the US, and it is a level that could cause roughly one extra cancer case in 500 young adults. However, natural radiation levels are higher in some parts of the world than the projected level mentioned above, and about 4 people out of 10 can be expected to develop cancer without exposure to radiation. Further, the radiation exposure resulting from the incident for most people living in Fukushima is so small compared to background radiation that it may be impossible to find statistically significant evidence of increases in cancer.

The highest recorded radiation level outside of Fukushima peaked at 40 mSv, which is below the threshold statistically linked to an increased risk of cancer. 100 mSv represents the level at which a definitive increased risk of cancer occurs. Radiation above this level increases the risk of cancer, and after 400 mSv radiation poisoning can occur, but is unlikely to be fatal.

=== Air exposure within 30 kilometers ===
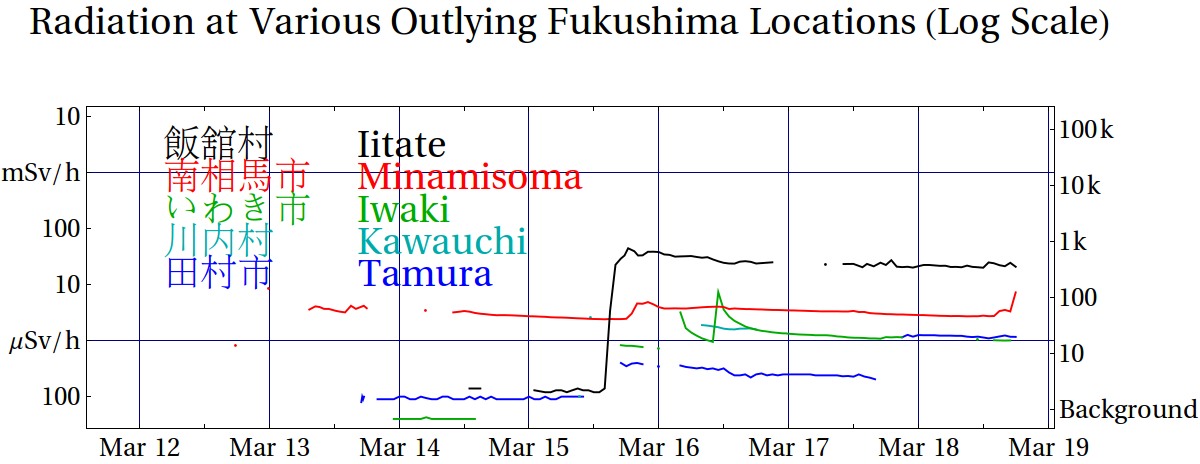
Dose rates for locations in Fukushima Prefecture and neighboring prefectures. * Iitate, Fukushima * Minamisōma, Fukushima * Iwaki, Fukushima * Tamura, Fukushima

The zone within 20 km from the plant was evacuated on 12 March, while residents within a distance of up to 30 km were advised to stay indoors. IAEA reported on 14 March that about 150 people in the vicinity of the plant "received monitoring for radiation levels"; 23 of these people were also decontaminated. From 25 March, nearby residents were encouraged to participate in voluntary evacuation.

At a distance of 30 km (19 mi) from the site, radiation of 3–170 μSv/h was measured to the north-west on 17 March, while it was 1–5 μSv/h in other directions. Experts said exposure to this amount of radiation for 6 to 7 hours would result in absorption of the maximum level considered safe for one year. On 16 March Japan's ministry of science measured radiation levels of up to 330 μSv/h 20 kilometers northwest of the power plant. At some locations around 30 km from the Fukushima plant, the dose rates rose significantly in 24 hours on 16–17 March: in one location from 80 to 170 μSv/h and in another from 26 to 95 μSv/h. The levels varied according to the direction from the plant. In most locations, the levels remained well below the levels required to damage human health, as the recommended annual maximum limit is well below the level that would affect human health.

Natural exposure varies from place to place but delivers a dose equivalent in the vicinity of 2.4 mSv/year, or about 0.3 μSv/h. For comparison, one chest x-ray is about 0.2 mSv and an abdominal CT scan is supposed to be less than 10 mSv (but it has been reported that some abdominal CT scans can deliver as much as 90 mSv). People can mitigate their exposure to radiation through a variety of protection techniques.

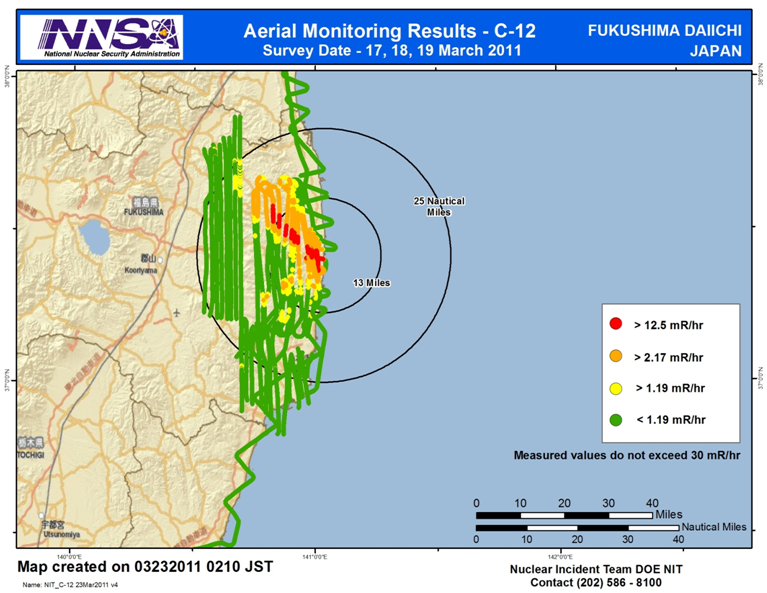
DOE and NNSA aerial survey of the area surrounding the plant 17–19 March 2011. NW dispersion of plume obvious. Source: The Situation in Japan (Updated 1/25/13) Department of Energy

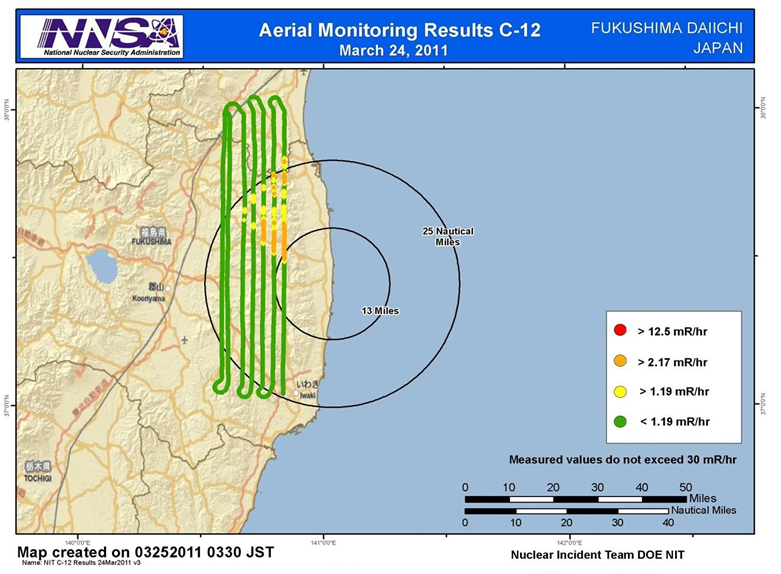
Same survey single-day flight revision on 24 March 2011.

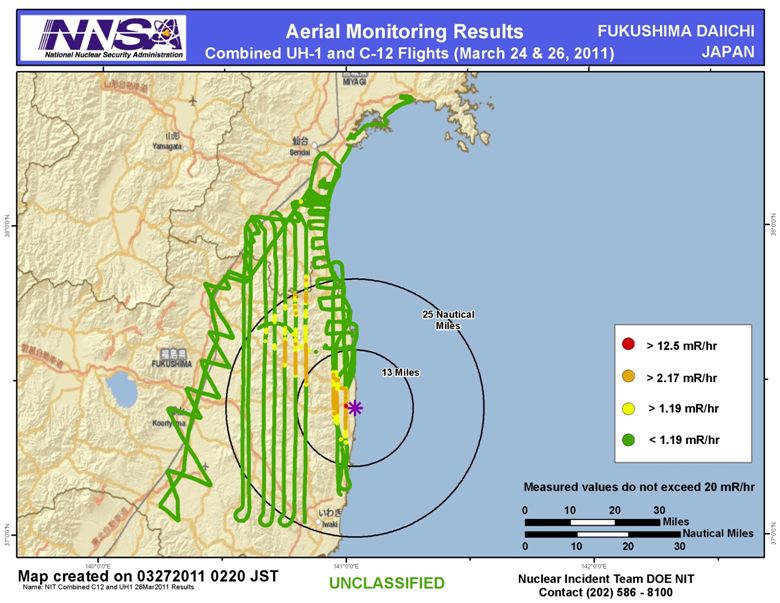
Same survey performed 24 and 26 March.

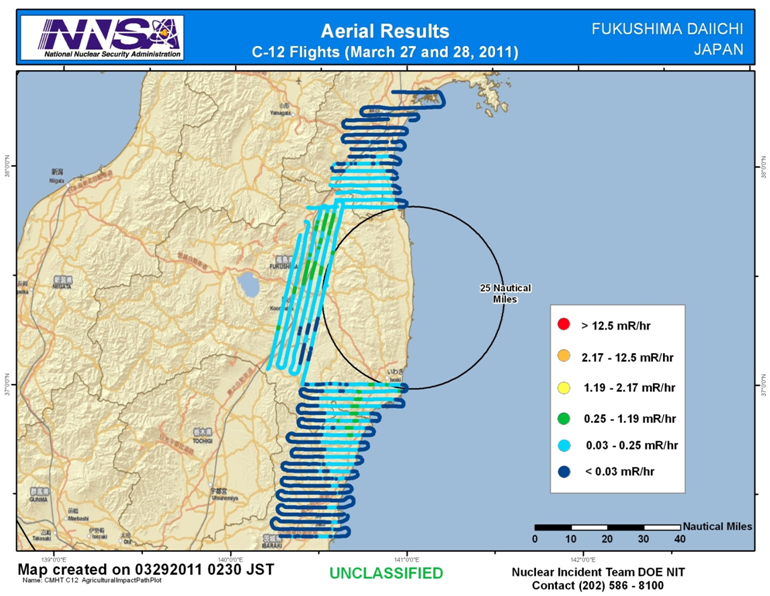
Broader area survey focusing on outside the 24-mile radius, from 27 and 28 March.

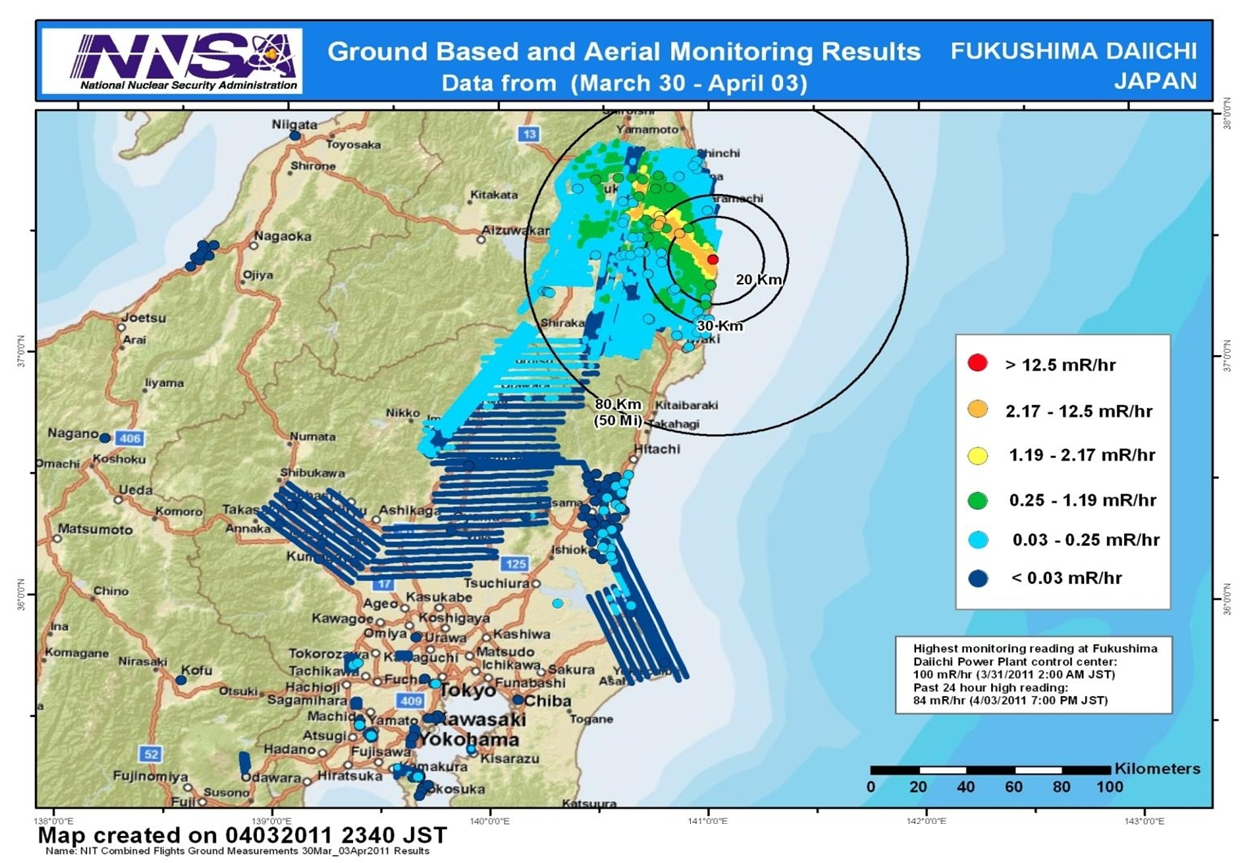
Combination of measurements made from 30 March to 3 April.

On 22 April 2011 a Japanese government report was presented by Minister of Trade Yukio Edano to leaders of the town Futaba. In it predictions were made about radioactivity releases for the years 2012 up to 2132. According to this report, in several parts of Fukushima Prefecture – including Futaba and Okuma – the air would remain dangerously radioactive at levels above 50 millisieverts a year. This was all based on measurements done in November 2011.

In August 2012, Japanese academic researchers announced that 10,000 people living near the plant in Minamisoma City at the time of the accident had been exposed to well less than 1 millisievert of radiation. The researchers stated that the health dangers from such exposure was "negligible". Said participating researcher Masaharu Tsubokura, "Exposure levels were much lower than those reported in studies even several years after the Chernobyl incident."

=== Most detailed radiation map published by the Japanese government ===
A detailed map was published by the Ministry of Education, Culture, Sports, Science and Technology, going online on 18 October 2011. The map contains the caesium concentrations and radiation levels caused by the airborne radioactivity from the Fukushima nuclear reactor. This website contains both web-based and PDF versions of the maps, providing information by municipality as had been the case previously, but also measurements by district. The maps were intended to help the residents who had called for better information on contamination levels between areas of the same municipalities, using soil and air sample data already released. A grid is laid over a map of most of eastern Japan. Selecting a square in the grid zooms in on that area, at which point users can choose more detailed maps displaying airborne contamination levels, caesium-134 or -137 levels, or total caesium levels. Radiation maps

=== Ground and water contamination within 30 kilometers ===
The unrecovered bodies of approximately 1,000 quake and tsunami victims within the plant's evacuation zone are believed to be inaccessible at the time of 1 April 2011 due to detectable levels of radiation.

=== Air exposure outside of 30 kilometers ===
Tokyo low-level gamma radiation with comparisons to average annual radiation intake. Based on Geiger counter measurements in Tokyo. Does not show radiation from physically transported sources, i.e. particulate matter transported in food, water, or the atmosphere.

Radiation levels in Tokyo on 15 March were at one point measured at 0.809 μSv/hour although they were later reported to be at "about twice the normal level". Later, on 15 March 2011, Edano reported that radiation levels were lower and the average radiation dose rate over the whole day was 0.109 μSv/h. The wind direction on 15 March dispersed radioactivity away from the land and back over the Pacific Ocean. On 16 March, the Japanese radiation warning system, SPEEDI, indicated high levels of radioactivity would spread further than 30 km from the plant, but Japanese authorities did not relay the information to citizens because "the location or the amount of radioactive leakage was not specified at the time." From 17 March, IAEA received regular updates on radiation from 46 cities and indicated that they had remained stable and were "well below levels which are dangerous to human health". In hourly measurements of these cities until 20 March, no significant changes were reported.

On 18 June 2012 it became known that from 17 to 19 March 2011 in the days directly after the explosions, American military aircraft gathered radiation data in an area with a radius of 45 kilometers around the plant for the U.S. Department of Energy. The maps revealed radiation levels of more than 125 microsieverts per hour at 25 kilometers northwest of the plant, which means that people in these areas were exposed to the annual permissible dose within eight hours. The maps were neither made public nor used for evacuation of residents.

On 18 March 2011 the U.S. government sent the data through the Japanese Foreign Ministry to the NISA under the Ministry of Economy, Trade and Industry, and the Japanese Ministry of Education, Culture, Sports, Science and Technology got the data on 20 March.

The data were not forwarded to the prime minister's office and the Nuclear Safety Commission, and subsequently not used to direct the evacuation of the people living around the plant. Because a substantial portion of radioactive materials released from the plant went northwest and fell onto the ground, and some residents were "evacuated" in this direction, these people could have avoided unnecessary exposure to radiation had the data been published directly. According to Tetsuya Yamamoto, chief nuclear safety officer of the Nuclear Safety Agency, "It was very regrettable that we didn't share and utilize the information." But an official of the Science and Technology Policy Bureau of the technology ministry, Itaru Watanabe, said it was more appropriate for the United States, rather than Japan, to release the data. On 23 March – after the Americans – Japan released its own fallout maps, compiled by Japanese authorities from measurements and predictions from the computer simulations of SPEEDI. On 19 June 2012 Minister of Science Hirofumi Hirano said that Japan would review the decision of the Science Ministry and the Nuclear-Safety Agency in 2011 to ignore the radiation maps provided by the United States. He defended his ministry's handling of the matter with the remark that its task was to measure radiation levels on land. But the government should reconsider its decision not to publish the maps or use the information. Studies would be done by the authorities, whether the maps could have been a help with the evacuations.

On 30 March 2011, the IAEA stated that its operational criteria for evacuation were exceeded in the village of Iitate, Fukushima, 39 kilometres (24 miles) north-west of Fukushima I, outside the existing 30 kilometres (19 miles) radiation exclusion zone. The IAEA advised the Japanese authorities to carefully assess the situation there. Experts from Kyoto University and Hiroshima University released a study of soil samples, on 11 April, that revealed that "as much as 400 times the normal levels of radiation could remain in communities beyond a 30-kilometer radius from the Fukushima" site.

Urine samples taken from 10 children in the capital of Fukushima Prefecture were analyzed in a French laboratory. All of them contained caesium-134. The sample of an eight-year-old girl contained 1.13 becquerels/liter. The children were living up to 60 kilometers away from the troubled nuclear power plant. The Fukushima Network for Saving Children urged the Japanese government to check the children in Fukushima. The Japanese non-profit Radiation Effects Research Foundation said that people should not overreact, because there are no reports known of health problems with these levels of radiation.

==== Radioactive dust particles ====
On 31 October 2011 a scientist from the Worcester Polytechnic Institute, Marco Kaltofen, presented his findings on the releases of radioactive isotopes from the Fukushima accidents at the annual meeting of the American Public Health Association (APHA). Airborne dust contaminated with radioactive particles was released from the reactors into the air. This dust was found in Japanese car filters: they contained caesium-134 and caesium-137, and cobalt at levels as high as 3 nCi total activity per sample. Materials collected during April 2011 from Japan also contained iodine-131. Soil and settled dust were collected from outdoors and inside homes, and also from used children's shoes. High levels of caesium were found on the shoelaces. US air-filter and dust samples did not contain "hot" particles, except for air samples collected in Seattle, Washington in April 2011. Dust particles contaminated with radioactive caesium were found more than 100 miles from the Fukushima site, and could be detected on the U.S. West Coast.

=== Ground, water and sewage contamination outside of 30 kilometers ===
Tests concluded between 10 and 20 April revealed radioactive caesium in amounts of 2.0 and 3.2 kBq/kg in soil from the Tokyo districts of Chiyoda and Koto, respectively. On 5 May, government officials announced that radioactivity levels in Tokyo sewage had spiked in late March. Simple-sum measurements of all radioactive isotopes in sewage burned at a Tokyo treatment plant measured 170,000 Bq/kg "in the immediate wake of the Fukushima nuclear crisis". The government announced that the reason for the spike was unclear, but suspected rainwater. The 5 May announcement further clarified that as of 28 April, the radioactivity level in Tokyo sewage was 16,000 Bq/kg.

A detailed map of ground contamination within 80 kilometers of the plant, the joint product of the U.S. Department of Energy and the Japanese Ministry of Education, Culture, Sports, Science and Technology (MEXT), was released on 6 May. The map showed that a belt of contamination, with radioactivity from 3 to 14.7 MBq caesium-137 per square meter, spread to the northwest of the nuclear plant. For comparison, areas with activity levels with more than 0.55 MBq caesium-137 per square meter were abandoned after the 1986 Chernobyl accident. The village of Iitate and the town of Namie are impacted. Similar data was used to establish a map that would calculate the amount of radiation a person would be exposed to if a person were to stay outdoors for eight hours per day through 11 March 2012. Scientists preparing this map, as well as earlier maps, targeted a 20 mSv/a dosage target for evacuation. The government's 20 mSv/a target led to the resignation of Toshiso Kosako, Special Adviser on radiation safety issues to Japanese Prime Minister Naoto Kan, who stated "I cannot allow this as a scholar", and argued that the target is too high, especially for children; he also criticized the increased limit for plant workers. In response, parents' groups and schools in some smaller towns and cities in Fukushima Prefecture have organized decontamination of soil surrounding schools, defying orders from Tokyo asserting that the schools are safe. Eventually, the Fukushima education board plans to replace the soil at 26 schools with the highest radiation levels.

Anomalous "hot spots" have been discovered in areas far beyond the adjacent region. For example, experts cannot explain how radioactive caesium from the reactors at Fukushima ended up in Kanagawa more than 300 kilometers (190 mi) to the south.

In the first week of September the Ministry of Science published a new map showing radiation levels in Fukushima and four surrounding prefectures, based on the results of an aerial survey. In the map, different colors were used to show the level of radiation at locations one meter above the ground.

- Red: 19 microsieverts per hour or higher. The red band pointed in a north-west direction and was more than 30 kilometers long.
- Yellow: radiation between 3.8 and 19 microsieverts per hour. This corresponds to less than a chest X-ray to 3 chest X-rays. This is the threshold to designate an area an evacuation zone. The yellow area extended far beyond the evacuation zone already put into place.
- Light green: radiation between 0.5 and one microsieverts per hour. This was still far above the annual level of one hundred millisievert, which should cause no harm to people. This zone contained most of Fukushima Prefecture, southern parts of Miyagi Prefecture, and northern parts of Tochigi and Ibaraki prefectures.

Up to 307,000 becquerels of caesium per kilogram of soil were detected during a survey held in Fukushima City, 60 kilometers away from the crippled reactors, on 14 September 2011. This was triple the amount for contaminated soil that by Japanese governmental orders should be sealed into concrete. According to "Citizens Against Fukushima Aging Nuclear Power Plants", these readings were comparable to the high levels in special regulated zones where evacuation was required after the Chernobyl accident. They urged the government to designate the area as a hot spot, where residents would need to voluntarily evacuate and be eligible for state assistance. Professor Tomoya Yamauchi of the University of Kobe, in charge of the study, in which soil samples were tested from five locations around the district, noted that the decontamination conducted in some of the areas tested has not yet reduced the radiation to pre-accident levels.

On 18 October 2011 a hot-spot in a public square was found in the city of Kashiwa, Chiba in the Nedokoyadai district, by a resident walking with a dosimeter. He informed the city council. Their first readings were off the scale, as their Geiger-counter could measure up to 10 microsieverts per hour. Later measurements by the Chiba environment foundation reported a final result of 57.5 microsieverts per hour. On 21 October the roads around the place were sealed off, and the place was covered with sandbags three meters thick. Further investigations and check-ups were planned on 24 October 2011. These investigations showed on 23 October levels up to 276,000 becquerels radioactive caesium per kilogram of soil, 30 centimeters below the surface. The first comments of town officials on the find of 57.7 microsieverts per hour were that there could not be a link with the Fukushima disaster, but after the find of this large amount of caesium, officials of the Science Ministry could not deny the possibility that the cause could be found at the Fukushima-site.

In October 2011, radiation levels as high as those in the evacuation zone around Japan's Fukushima nuclear plant were detected in a Tokyo suburb. Japanese officials said the contamination was linked to the Fukushima nuclear accident. Contamination levels "as high as those inside Fukushima's no-go zone have been detected, with officials speculating that the hotspot was created after radioactive caesium carried in rain water became concentrated because of a broken gutter".

In October 2011 the Japanese Ministry of Science launched a phone hotline to deal with concerns about radiation exposure outside Fukushima Prefecture. Concerned Japanese citizens had been walking with Geiger-counters through their locality in search of all places with raised radiation levels. Whenever a site was found with a radiation dose at one meter above the ground more than one microsievert per hour and higher than nearby areas, this should be mentioned at the hotline. One microsievert per hour is the limit above this topsoil at school playgrounds would be removed, subsidized by the state of Japan. Local governments were asked to carry out simple decontamination works, such as clearing mud from ditches if necessary. When radiation levels would remain more than one microsievert higher than nearby areas even after the cleaning, the ministry offered to help with further decontamination. On the website of the ministry a guideline was posted on how to measure radiation levels in a proper way, how to hold the dosimeter and how long to wait for a proper reading.

In October 2011 hotspots were reported on the grounds of two elementary schools in Abiko in Chiba:

- 11.3 microsieverts per hour was detected on 25 September just above the surface of the ground near a ditch in the compounds of the Abiko Municipal Daiichi Elementary School. At 50 centimeters above the ground the reading was 1.7 microsieverts per hour. The soil in the ditch contained 60,768 becquerels per kilogram. After the soil was removed, the radiation decreased to 0.6 microsieverts per hour at 50 centimeters above groundlevel.
- 10.1 microsieverts per hour was found at the Abiko Municipal Namiki Elementary School near the surface of the ground where sludge removed from the swimming pool of the school had been buried. The area was covered with a waterproof tarp and dirt was put on top of the tarp to decrease the radiation; 0.6 microsieverts per hour was measured 50 centimeters above the ground after this was done.

Radioactive caesium was found in waste water discharged into Tokyo Bay from a cement factory in the prefecture Chiba east of Tokio. In September and October two water samples were taken, measuring 1,103 becquerels per liter and 1,054 becquerels per liter respectively. These were 14 to 15 times higher than the limit set by NISA. Ash from incinerators in the prefecture constituted the raw material to produce cement. In this process toxic substances are filtered out of the ashes, and the water used to clean these filters was discharged into Tokyo Bay. On 2 November 2011 this waste-water discharge was halted, and the Japanese authorities started a survey on the caesium contamination of the seawater of Tokyo Bay near the plant.

==== Caesium-134 and caesium-137 soil contamination map ====
On 12 November the Japanese government published a contamination map compiled by helicopter. This map covered a much wider area than before. Six new prefectures Iwate, Yamanashi, Nagano, Shizuoka, Gifu, and Toyama were included in this new map of the soil radioactivity of caesium-134 and caesium-137 in Japan. Contamination between 30,000 and 100,000 becquerels per square meter was found in Ichinoseki and Oshu (prefecture Iwate), in Saku, Karuizawa and Sakuho (prefecture Nagano, in Tabayama (prefecture Yamanashi) and elsewhere.

==== Computer simulations of caesium contamination ====
Based on radiation measurements made all over Japan between 20 March and 20 April 2011, and the atmospheric patterns in that period, computer simulations were performed by an international team of researchers, in cooperation with the University of Nagoya, in order to estimate the spread of radioactive materials like caesium-137. Their results, published in two studies on 14 November 2011, suggested that caesium-137 reached up to the northernmost island of Hokkaido, and the regions of Chugoku and Shikoku in western Japan at more than 500 kilometers from the Fukushima plant. Rain accumulated the caesium in the soil. Measured radioactivity per kilogram reached 250 becquerels in eastern Hokkaido, and 25 becquerels in the mountains of western Japan. According to the research group, these levels were not high enough to require decontamination. Professor Tetsuzo Yasunari of the University of Nagoya called for a national soil testing program because of the nationwide spread of radioactive material, and suggested identified hotspots, places with high radiation levels, should be marked with warning signs.

The first study concentrated on caesium-137. Around the nuclear plant, places were found containing up to 40.000 becquerels/kg, 8 times the governmental safety limit of 5.000 becquerels/kg. Places further away were just below this maximum. East and north-east from the plant the soil was contaminated the most. North-west and westwards the soil was less contaminated, because of mountain protection.

The second study had a wider scope, and was meant to study the geographic spread of more-radioactive isotopes, like tellurium and iodine. Because these isotopes deposit themselves in the soil with rain, Norikazu Kinoshita and his colleagues observed the effect of two specific rain-showers on 15 and 21 March 2011. The rainfall on 15 March contaminated the grounds around the plant; the second shower transported the radioactivity much further from the plant, in the direction of Tokyo. According to the authors, the soil should be decontaminated, but when this is found impossible, farming should be limited.

==== Elementary school yard in Tokyo ====
On 13 December 2011 extremely high readings of radioactive caesium – 90,600 becquerels per kilogram, 11 times the governmental limit of 8000 becquerels – were detected in a groundsheet at the Suginami Ward elementary school in Tokyo at a distance of 230 kilometers from Fukushima. The sheet was used to protect the school lawn against frost from 18 March until 6 April 2011. Until November this sheet was stored alongside a gymnasium. In places near this storage area up to 3.95 microsieverts per hour were measured one centimeter above the ground. The school planned to burn the sheet. Further inspections were requested.

=== Radiation exposure in the city of Fukushima ===
All citizens of the town Fukushima received dosimeters to measure the precise dose of radiation to which they were exposed. After September the city of Fukushima collected the 36,478 "glass badges" of dosimeters from all its citizens for analysis. It turned out that 99 percent had not been exposed to more than 0.3 millisieverts in September 2011, except four young children from one family: a girl, in third year elementary school, had received 1.7 millisieverts, and her three brothers had been exposed to 1.4 to 1.6 millisieverts. Their home was situated near a highly radioactive spot, and after this find the family moved out of Fukushima Prefecture. A city official said that this kind of exposure would not affect their health.

Similar results were obtained for a three-month period from September 2011: among a group of 36,767 residents in Fukushima city, 36,657 had been exposed to less than 1 millisievert, and the average dose was 0.26 millisieverts. For 10 residents, the readings ranged from 1.8 to 2.7 millisieverts, but these values are mostly believed to be related to usage errors (dosimeters left outside or exposed to X-ray luggage screening).

=== Disposal of radioactive ash ===
Due to objections from concerned residents it became more and more difficult to dispose of the ashes of burned household garbage in and around Tokyo. The ashes of waste facilities in the Tohoku, Kanto and Kōshin'etsu regions were proven to be contaminated with radioactive caesium. According to the guidelines of the Ministry of Environment, ashes radiating 8,000 becquerels per kilogram or lower could be buried. Ashes with caesium levels between 8,000 and 100,000 becquerels should be secured, and buried in concrete vessels. A survey was done on 410 sites of waste-disposal facilities, on how the ash disposal was proceeding. At 22 sites, mainly in the Tokyo Metropolitan area, the ashes with levels under 8000 becquerels could not be buried due to the objections of concerned residents. At 42 sites, ashes were found that contained over 8,000 becquerels of caesium, which could not be buried. The ministry made plans to send officials to meetings in the municipalities to explain to the Japanese people that the waste disposal was done safely, and to demonstrate how the disposal of the ashes above 8000 becquerels was conducted.

On 5 January 2012 the Nambu (south) Clean Center, a waste incinerator in Kashiwa, Chiba, was taken out of production by the city council because the storage room was completely filled with 200 metric tons of radioactive ash that could not disposed of in landfills. Storage at the plant was full, with 1049 drums, and some 30 tons more were still to be taken out of the incinerator. In September 2011, the factory was closed for two months for the same reason. The center's special advanced procedures were able to minimize the volume of the ash, but radioactive caesium was concentrated to levels above the national limit of 8.000 becquerels per kilogram for waste disposal in landfills. It was not possible to secure new storage space for the radioactive ash. Radiation levels in Kashiwa were higher than in surrounding areas, and ashes containing up to 70,800 becquerels of radioactive caesium per kilogram – higher than the national limit – were detected in the city. Other cities around Kashiwa were facing the same problem: radioactive ash was piling up. Chiba prefecture asked Abiko and Inzai to accept temporary storage at the Teganuma waste-disposal facility located at their border. But this met strong opposition from their citizens.

=== Deposition of radioactivity and effect on agricultural products and building materials ===
Radiation monitoring in all 47 prefectures showed wide variation, but an upward trend in 10 of them on 23 March. No deposition could be determined in 28 of them until 25 March The highest value obtained was in Ibaraki (480 Bq/m^{2} on 25 March) and Yamagata (750 Bq/m^{2} on 26 March) for iodine-13. For caesium-137, the highest values were in Yamagata at 150 and 1200 Bq/m^{2} respectively.

Measurements made in Japan in a number of locations have shown the presence of radionuclides in the ground. On 19 March, upland soil levels of 8,100 Bq/kg of Cs-137 and 300,000 Bq/kg of I-131 were reported. One day later, the measured levels were 163,000 Bq/kg of Cs-137 and 1,170,000 Bq/kg of I-131.

==== Summary of restrictions imposed by the Japanese government as of 25 April 2011 ====
Item	Shipping restrictions					Consumption restrictions
Item	Fukushima	Ibaraki	Tochigi	Gunma	Chiba	Fukushima
Raw milk	3/21 – 4/8: Kitakata, Bandai, Inawashiro, Mishima, Aizumisato, Shimogou, Minami-aizu 3/21 – 4/16: Fukushima, Nihonmatsu, Date, Motomiya, Kunimi, Ootama, Kooriyama, Sukagawa, Tamura (excl. former Miyakoji), Miharu, Ono, Kagamiishi, Ishikawa, Asakawa, Hirata, Furudono, Shirakawa, Yabuki, Izumizaki, Nakajima, Nishigou, Samegawa, Hanawa, Yamatsuri, Iwaki; 3/21 – 4/21: Souma, Shinchi; 3/21 – ongoing: All other areas	3/23 – 4/10: All areas				
Spinach	3/21 – ongoing: All areas	3/21 – 4/17: All areas except Kita-ibaraki, Takahagi 3/21 – ongoing: Kita-ibaraki, Takahagi	3/21 – 4/21: Nasushiobara, Shioya 3/21 – ongoing: All other areas	3/21 – 4/8: All areas	4/4 – 4/22: Asahi, Katori, Tako	3/23 – ongoing: All areas
Kakina	3/21 – ongoing: All areas	3/21 – 4/17: All areas	3/21 – 4/14: All areas	3/21 – 4/8: All areas		3/23 – ongoing: All areas
Chrysanthemum	3/23 – ongoing: All areas				4/4 – 4/22: Asahi	3/23 – ongoing: All areas
Bok choi	3/23 – ongoing: All areas				4/4 – 4/22: Asahi	3/23 – ongoing: All areas
Korean lettuce	3/23 – ongoing: All areas				4/4 – 4/22: Asahi	3/23 – ongoing: All areas
Other non-round leafy vegetables	3/23 – ongoing: All areas					3/23 – ongoing: All areas
Round leafy vegetables (such as cabbage)	3/23 – ongoing: All areas					3/23 – ongoing: All areas
Brassicaceae buds (broccoli, cauliflower, etc.)	3/23 – ongoing: All areas					3/23 – ongoing: All areas
Turnip	3/23 – ongoing: All areas					
Parsley		3/23 – 4/17: All areas			4/4 – 4/22: Asahi	
Celery					4/4 – 4/22: Asahi	
Shiitake	4/13 – 4/25: Iwaki 4/13 – ongoing: Shinchi, Date, Iitate, Souma, Minami-souma, Namie, Futaba, Ookuma, Tomioka, Naraha, Hirono, Kawamata, Katsurao, Tamura, Kawauchi; 4/18 – ongoing: Fukushima; 4/25 – ongoing: Motomiya					4/13 – ongoing: Iitate
Sand lance young	4/20 – ongoing: All areas					4/20 – ongoing: All areas

==== Agricultural products ====
On 19 March, the Japanese Ministry of Health, Labour and Welfare announced that levels of radioactivity exceeding legal limits had been detected in milk produced in the Fukushima area and in certain vegetables in Ibaraki. On 21 March, IAEA confirmed that "in some areas, iodine-131 in milk and in freshly grown leafy vegetables, such as spinach and spring onions, is significantly above the levels set by Japan for restricting consumption". One day later, iodine-131 (sometimes above safe levels) and caesium-137 (always at safe levels) detection was reported in Ibaraki prefecture. On 21 March, levels of radioactivity in spinach grown in the open air in Kitaibaraki city in Ibaraki, around 75 kilometers south of the nuclear plant, were 24,000 becquerel (Bq)/kg of iodine-131, 12 times more than the limit of 2,000 Bq/kg, and 690 Bq/kg of caesium, 190 Bq/kg above the limit. In four Prefectures (Ibaraki, Totigi, Gunma, Fukushima), distribution of spinach and kakina was restricted as well as milk from Fukushima. On 23 March, similar restrictions were placed on more leafy vegetables (komatsuna, cabbages) and all flowerheads brassicas (like cauliflower) in Fukushima, while parsley and milk distribution was restricted in Ibaraki. On 24 March, IAEA reported that virtually all milk samples and vegetable samples taken in Fukushima and Ibaraki on 18–21 and 16–22 March respectively were above the limit. Samples from Chiba, Ibaraki and Tochigi also had excessive levels in celery, parsley, spinach and other leafy vegetables. In addition, certain samples of beef mainly taken on 27–show of 29 Marched concentrations of iodine-131 and/or caesium-134 and caesium-137 above the regulatory levels.

After the detection of radioactive caesium above legal limits in Sand lances caught off the coast of Ibaraki Prefecture, the government of the prefecture banned such fishing. On 11 May, caesium levels in tea leaves from a prefecture "just south of Tokyo" were reported to exceed government limits: this was the first agricultural product from Kanagawa Prefecture that exceeded safety limits. In addition to Kanagawa Prefecture, agricultural products from Tochigi and Ibaraki prefectures have also been found to exceed the government limits, for example, pasture grass collected on 5 May, measured 3,480 Bq/kg of radioactive caesium, approximately 11 times the state limit of 300 becquerels. Even into July radioactive beef was found on sale in eleven prefectures, as far away as Kōchi and Hokkaido. Authorities explained that until that point testing had been performed on the skin and exterior of livestock. Animal feed and meat cuts had not been checked for radioactivity previously.

Hay and straw were found contaminated with caesium 80 kilometres (50 mi) from the reactors and outside the evacuation zone. The news of the contamination of foods with radioactive substances leaking from the Fukushima nuclear reactors damaged the mutual trust between local food producers, including farmers, and consumers. The source of caesium was found to be rice straw that had been fed to the animals. A notice from the Japanese government that was sent to cattle farmers after the nuclear accident made no mention of the possibility that rice straw could be contaminated with radioactive materials from the fallout. Beef from Fukushima Prefecture was removed from the distribution channels. Health minister Kohei Otsuka stated on 17 July 2011 that this removal might not be sufficient. The urine of all cattle for sale was tested in order to return those cows that showed levels of radioactive substances higher than the government-set limit to farms so they could be decontaminated by feeding them safe hay. The minister said that the government should try to buy uncontaminated straw and hay in other parts of the country and offer this to the farmers in the affected areas. All transport of beef raised in the prefecture Fukushima was prohibited after 19 July. The meat of some 132 cows was sold to at least 36 of the 47 prefectures of Japan. In more and more places contaminated meat was found.

In March 2012 up to 18,700 becquerels per kilogram radioactive caesium was detected in yamame, or landlocked masu salmon, caught in the Niida river near the town Iitate, which was over 37 times the legal limit of 500 becquerels/kg. The fish was caught for testing purposes prior to the opening of the fishing season. Fishing cooperatives were asked to refrain from catching and eating yamame fish from this river and all streams adjacent to it. No fish was sold in local markets.

No fishing was allowed in the river Nojiri in the region Okuaizu in Fukushima after-mid March 2012. The fish caught in this river contained 119 to 139 becquerels of radioactive caesium per kilogram, although this river is located some 130 kilometers from the damaged reactors. In 2011 at this place the fish measured about 50 becquerels per kilogram, and the fishing season was opened as usual. But fishing was not popular in 2011. Local people hoped it would be better in 2012. After the new findings the fishing season was postponed.

On 28 March 2012 smelt caught in the Akagi Onuma lake near the city of Maebashi in the prefecture Gunma was found to be contaminated with 426 becquerels per kilogram of caesium.

In April 2012 radioactive caesium concentrations of 110 becquerels per kilogram were found in silver crucian carp fish caught in the Tone River north of Tokyo, some 180 kilometers away from the Fukushima Daiichi Plant. Six fishery cooperatives and 10 towns along the river were asked to stop all shipments of fish caught in the river. In March 2012 fish and shellfish caught in a pond near the same river were found to contain levels above the new legal limits of 100 becquerels per kilogram.

The Dutch bio-farming company Waterland International and a Japanese federation of farmers made an agreement in March 2012 to plant and grow camellia on 2000 to 3000 hectare. The seeds will be used to produce bio-diesel, which could be used to produce electricity. According to director William Nolten the region had a big potential for the production of clean energy. Some 800,000 hectares in the region could not be used to produce food anymore, and after the disaster because of fears for contamination the Japanese people refused to buy food produced in the region anyway. Experiments would be done to find out whether camelia was capable of extracting caesium from the soil. An experiment with sunflowers had no success.

High levels of radioactive caesium were found in 23 varieties of freshwater fish sampled at five rivers and lakes in Fukushima Prefecture between December 2011 and February 2012 and in 8 locations on the open sea. On 2 July 2012 the Ministry of the Environment published that it had found radioactive caesium between 61 and 2,600 becquerels per kilogram. 2,600 becquerels were found in a kind of goby caught in Mano River, which flows from Iitate Village to the city of Minamisoma, north of the nuclear plant. Water bugs, common food for freshwater fish, also showed high levels of 330 to 670 becquerels per kilogram. Marine fish was found less contaminated and showed levels between 2.15 and 260 Bq/kg. Marine fish might be more capable of excreting caesium from their bodies, because saltwater fish have the ability to excrete salt. The Japanese Ministry of the Environment would closely monitor freshwater fish as radioactive caesium might remain for much longer periods in their bodies. According to Japanese regulations, food is considered safe for consumption up to a maximum of 100 Bq/kg.

In August 2012, the Health ministry found that caesium levels had dropped to undetectable levels in most cultivated vegetables from the affected area, while food sourced from forests, rivers or lakes in the Tohoku and northern Kanto regions are showing excessive contamination.

In a 'murasoi'-fish (or rock-fish Sebastes pachycephalus) caught in January 2013 at the coast of Fukushima an enormous amount of radioactive caesium was found: 254,000 becquerel/kilogram, or 2540 times the legal limitm in Japan for seafood.

On 21 February 2013 a greenling – 38 centimeters long and weighing 564 grams – was caught near a water intake of the reactor units. It did set a new record: containing 740,000 becquerels radioactive caesium per kilogram, 7,400 times the Japanese limit deemed safe for human consumption. The previous record of caesium concentration in fish was 510,000 Bq/kg detected in another greenling. On the sea floor a net was installed by TEPCO, in order to prevent migrating fish to escape from the contaminated area.

==== Cattle and beef ====
As of July 2011, the Japanese government has been unable to control the spread of radioactive material into the nation's food, and "Japanese agricultural officials say meat from more than 500 cattle that were likely to have been contaminated with radioactive caesium has made its way to supermarkets and restaurants across Japan". On 22 July it became known that at least 1400 cows were shipped from 76 farms that were fed with contaminated hay and rice-straw that had been distributed by agents in Miyagi and farmers in the prefectures of Fukushima and Iwate, near the crippled Fukushima Daiichi nuclear power plant. Supermarkets and other stores were asking their customers to return the meat. Farmers were asking for help, and the Japanese government was considering whether it should buy and burn all this suspect meat. Beef had 2% more Caesium than the government's strict limit.

On 26 July more than 2,800 cattle carcasses, fed with caesium-contaminated food, had been shipped for public consumption to 46 of the 47 prefectures in Japan, with only Okinawa remaining free. Part of this beef, which had reached the markets, still needed to be tested. In an attempt to ease consumer concern the Japanese government promised to impose inspections on all this beef, and to buy the meat back when higher-than-permissible caesium levels were detected during the tests. The government planned to eventually pass on the buy-back costs to TEPCO. The same day the Japanese ministry of agriculture urged farmers and merchants to renounce the use and sale of compost made of manure from cows that may have been fed the contaminated straw. The measure also applied to humus from leaves fallen from trees. After developing guidelines for safety levels of radioactive caesium in compost and humus, this voluntary ban could be lifted.

On 28 July a ban was imposed on all the shipments on cattle from the prefecture Miyagi. Some 1,031 beasts had been shipped that probably were fed with contaminated rice-straw. Measurements of 6 of them revealed 1,150 becquerels per kilogram, more than twice the governmental set safety level. Because the origins were scattered all over the prefecture, Miyagi became the second prefecture with a ban on all beef-cattle shipments. In the year before 11 March about 33,000 cattle were traded from Miyagi.

On 1 August a ban was put on all cattle in the prefecture Iwate, after 6 cows from two villages were found with heavy levels of caesium. Iwate was the third prefecture where this was decided. Shipments of cattle and meat would only be allowed after examination, and when the level of caesium was below the regulatory standard. In Iwate some 36,000 cattle were produced in a year. All cattle would be checked for radioactive contamination before shipment, and the Japanese government asked the prefecture to temporarily reduce the number of shipments to match its inspection capability.

On 3 August, the prefecture Shimane, in western Japan, conducted radiation checks on all beef cattle to ease consumer concerns about food safety. Starting from the second week of August all cattle were tested. Late July at one farm in this prefecture rice-straw was discovered with radioactive caesium levels exceeding the government safety guide. Although all other tests of beef cattle found far lower levels of radioactivity than the government standard, prices of beef from Shimane plummeted and wholesalers avoided all cattle from the prefecture. All processed beef would undergo preliminary screening, and meat registering 250 becquerels per kilogram or more of radioactive caesium – half the government safety level – would be tested further.

The second week of August the prefecture of Fukushima Prefecture initiated a buy-out of all cattle that could not be sold because the high levels of caesium in the meat. The prefecture decided to buy back all beef cattle that had become too old for shipment due to the shipping suspension in place since July. On 2 August a group of farmers agreed with the Fukushima prefectural government to set up a consultative body to regulate this process. The prefectural government provided the subsidies needed. There was some delay, because the farmers and the local government could not agree about the prices.

The problems for the farmers were growing, because they did not know how to protect their cattle from contamination and did not know how to feed their cattle. The farmers said that the buy-back plan needed to be implemented immediately.

On 5 August 2011, in response to calls for more support by farmers, the Japanese government revealed a plan to buy up all beef contaminated with radioactive caesium, that had already reached the distribution chains, as an additional measurement to support beef cattle farmers. The plan included:

- the buy-out of about 3,500 head of cattle suspected to have been fed with contaminated rice straw, with caesium in excess of the safety limit.
- regardless the fact that some beef could be within the national safety limits.
- all this meat would be burned, to keep it out of distribution-channels

Other measurements were the expansion of subsidies to beef cattle farmers:

- Farmers who were unable to ship their cattle due to restrictions received 50,000 yen, (~ 630 dollars) per head of cattle regardless of the cattle's age.
- financial support was offered to prefectures that were buying up beef cattle, that had become too old to ship due to the ban.
- The Japanese Government planned to go on to buy all beef containing unsafe levels of radioactive caesium that reached the market through private organizations.

On 19 August 2011 was reported, the meat of 4 cows from one Fukushima farm had been found to be contaminated with radioactive caesium in excess of the government-set safety limits. The day after the meat of 5 other cows from this farm was also found to contain radioactive caesium. Because of this the central government delayed lifting a shipment ban on Fukushima beef. The 9 cows were among a total of over 200 head of cattle shipped from the farm and slaughtered at a facility in Yokohama city between 11 March nuclear accident and April. The beef had been stored by a food producer. The farmer denied feeding the cows contaminated rice straw, instead he used imported hay that had been stored at another farm.

Japan banned Fukushima beef. These domestic animals were affected by the food supply. It was reported that 136 cows consumed feed affected by radioactive caesium. A number of cows were found to have consumed rice straw containing high levels of radioactive caesium. This meat had already been distributed nationwide and that it "could have already reached consumers." They traced contaminated beef on farms near the Fukushima power plant, and on farms 100 km (70 miles) away. "The government has also acknowledged that the problem could be wider than just Fukushima."

By August 2012, sampling of beef from affected areas revealed that 3 out of 58,460 beef samples contained radioactivity above regulatory limits. Much of the radioactivity is believed to have come from contaminated feed. Radioactivity infiltration into the beef supply has subsided with time, and is projected to continue decreasing.

==== Nattō ====
In August 2011, a group of 5 manufacturers of nattō, or fermented soybeans, in Mito, Ibaraki planned to seek damages from TEPCO because their sales had fallen by almost 50 percent. Nattō is normally packed in rice-straw and after the discovery of caesium contamination, they had lost a number of customers. The lost sales from April–August 2011 had risen to around 1.3 million dollars.

==== Tea-leaves ====
On 3 September 2011 radioactive caesium exceeding the government's safety limit had been detected in tea leaves in Chiba and Saitama prefectures, near Tokyo. This was the ministry's first discovery of radioactive substances beyond legal limits since the tests of food stuffs started in August. These tests were conducted in order to verify local government data using different numbers and kinds of food samples. Tea leaves of one type of tea from Chiba Prefecture contained 2,720 becquerels of radioactive caesium per kilogram, 5 times above the legal safety limit. A maximum of 1,530 becquerels per kilogram was detected in 3 kinds of tea leaves from Saitama Prefecture. Investigations were done to find out where the tea was grown, and to determine how much tea had already made its way to market. Tea producers were asked to recall their products, when necessary. As tea leaves are never directly consumed, tea produced from processed leaves are expected to contain no more than 1/35th the density of caesium (in the case of 2720bq/kg, the tea will show just 77bq/L, below the 200bq/L legal limit at the time)

In the prefecture Shizuoka at the beginning of April 2012, tests done on tea-leaves grown inside a greenhouse were found to contain less than 10 becquerels per kilogram, below the new limit of 100 becquerels, The tests were done in a governmental laboratory in Kikugawa city, to probe caesium-concentrations before the at the end of April the tea-harvest season would start.

The health ministry published in August 2012, that caesium levels in tea made from "yacon" leaves and in samples of Japanese tea "shot through the ceiling" this year.

==== Rice ====
On 19 August radioactive caesium was found in a sample of rice. This was in Ibaraki Prefecture, just north of Tokyo, in a sample of rice from the city of Hokota, about 100 miles south of the nuclear plant. The prefecture said the radioactivity was well within safe levels: it measured 52 becquerels per kilogram, about one-tenth of the government-set limit for grains. Two other samples tested at the same time showed no contamination. The Agriculture Ministry said it was the first time that more than trace levels of caesium had been found in rice.

On 16 September 2011 the results were published of the measurements of radioactive caesium in rice. The results were known of around 60 percent of all test-locations. Radioactive materials were detected in 94 locations, or 4.3 percent of the total. But the highest level detected so far, in Fukushima Prefecture, was 136 becquerels per kilogram, about a quarter of the government's safety limit of 500 Becquerel per kilogram. Tests were conducted in 17 prefectures, and were completed in more than half of them. In 22 locations radioactive materials were detected in harvested rice. The highest level measured was 101.6 becquerels per kilogram, or one fifth of the safety limit. Shipments of rice did start in 15 prefectures, including all 52 municipalities in the prefecture Chiba. In Fukushima shipments of ordinary rice did start in 2 municipalities, and those of early-harvested rice in 20 municipalities.

On 23 September 2011 radioactive caesium in concentrations above the governmental safety limit was found in rice samples collected in an area in the northeastern part of the prefecture Fukushima. Rice-samples taken before the harvest showed 500 becquerels per kilogram in the city of Nihonmatsu. The Japanese government ordered a two way testing procedure of samples taken before and after the harvest. Pre-harvest tests were carried out in nine prefectures in the regions of Tohoku and Kanto. After the find of this high level of caesium, the prefectural government dis increase the number of places to be tested within the city from 38 to about 300. The city of Nihonmatsu held an emergency meeting on 24 September with officials from the prefecture government. The farmers, that already had started harvesting, were ordered to store their crop until the post-harvest tests were available.

On 16 November 630 becquerels per kilogram of radioactive caesium was detected in rice harvested in the Oonami district in Fukushima City. All rice of the fields nearby was stored and none of this rice had been sold to the market. On 18 November all 154 farmers in the district were asked to suspend all shipments of rice. Tests were ordered on rice samples from all 154 farms in the district. The result of this testing was reported on 25 November: five more farms were found with caesium contaminated rice at a distance of 56 kilometers from the disaster reactors in the Oonami district of Fukushima City, The highest level of caesium detected was 1,270 becquerels per kilogram.

On 28 November 2011 the prefecture of Fukushima reported the find of caesium-contaminated rice, up to 1050 Becquerels per kilogram, in samples of 3 farms in the city Date at a distance of 50 kilometers from the Fukushima Daiichi reactors. Some 9 kilo's of this crops were already sold locally before this date. Officials tried to find out who bought this rice. Because of this and earlier finds the government of the prefecture Fukushima decided to control more than 2300 farms in the whole district on caesium-contamination. A more precise number was mentioned by the Japanese newspaper The Mainichi Daily News: on 29 November orders were given to 2381 farms in Nihonmatsu and Motomiya to suspend part of their rice shipments. This number added to the already halted shipments at 1941 farms in 4 other districts including Date, raised the total to 4322 farms.

Rice exports from Japan to China became possible again after a bilateral governmental agreement in April 2012. With government-issued certificates of origin, Japanese rice produced outside Chiba, Fukushima, Gunma, Ibaraki, Niigata, Nagano, Miyagi, Saitama, Tokyo, Tochigi, and Saitama Prefectures was allowed to be exported. In the first shipment 140.000 tons of Hokkaido rice of the 2011 harvest was sold to China National Cereals, Oils and Foodstuffs Corporation.

==== Noodles ====
On 7 February 2012 noodles contaminated with radioactive caesium (258 becquerels of caesium per kilogram) were found in a restaurant in Okinawa. The noodles, called "Okinawa soba", were apparently produced with water filtered through contaminated ashes from wood originating from the prefecture Fukushima. On 10 February 2012 the Japanese Agency for Forestry set out a warning not to use ashes from wood or charcoal, even when the wood itself contained less than the governmental set maximum of 40 becquerels per kilo for wood or 280 becquerels for charcoal. When the standards were set, nobody thought about the use of the ashes to be used for the production of foods. But, in Japan it was a custom to use ashes when kneading noodles or to take away a bitter taste, or "aku" from "devil's tongue" and wild vegetables.

==== Mushrooms ====
On 13 October 2011 the city of Yokohama terminated the use of dried shiitake-mushrooms in school lunches after tests had found radioactive caesium in them up to 350 becquerels per kilogram. In shiitake mushrooms grown outdoors on wood in a city in the prefecture Ibaraki, 170 kilometers from the nuclear plant, samples contained 830 becquerels per kilogram of radioactive caesium, exceeding the government's limit of 500 becquerels. Radioactive contaminated shiitake mushrooms, above 500 becquerels per kilogram, were also found in two cities of prefecture Chiba, therefore restrictions were imposed on the shipments from these cities.

On 29 October the government of the prefecture Fukushima Prefecture announced that shiitake mushrooms grown indoors at a farm in Soma, situated at the coast north from the Fukushima Daiichi plant, were contaminated with radioactive caesium: They contained 850 becquerels per kilogram, and exceeded the national safety-limit of 500-becquerel. The mushrooms were grown on beds made of woodchips mixed with other nutrients. The woodchips in the mushroom-beds sold by the agricultural cooperative of Soma were thought to have caused of the contamination. Since 24 October 2011 this farm had shipped 1,070 100-gram packages of shiitake mushrooms to nine supermarkets. Besides these no other shiitake mushrooms produced by the farm were sold to customers.

In the city of Yokohama in March and October food was served to 800 people with dried shiitake-mushrooms that came from a farm near this town at a distance of 250 kilometer from Fukushima. The test-results of these mushrooms showed 2,770 Becquerels per kilo in March and 955 Becquerels per kilo in October, far above the limit of 500 Becquerels per kilo set by the Japanese government. The mushrooms were checked for contamination in the first week of November, after requests of concerned people with questions about possible contamination of the food served. No mushrooms were sold elsewhere.

On 10 November 2011 some 120 kilometers away southwest from the Fukushima-reactors in the prefecture Tochigi 649 becquerels of radioactive cesium per kilogram was measured in kuritake mushrooms. Four other cities of Tochigi did already stop with the sales and shipments of the mushrooms grown there. The farmers were asked to stop all shipments and to call back the mushrooms already on the market.

==== Drinking water ====
The regulatory safe level for iodine-131 and caesium-137 in drinking water in Japan are 100 Bq/kg and 200 Bq/kg respectively. The Japanese science ministry said on 20 March that radioactive substances were detected in tap water in Tokyo, as well as Tochigi, Gunma, Chiba and Saitama prefectures. IAEA reported on 24 March that drinking water in Tokyo, Fukushima and Ibaraki had been above regulatory limits between 16 and 21 March. On 26 March, IAEA reported that the values were now within legal limits. On 23 March, Tokyo drinking water exceeded the safe level for infants, prompting the government to distribute bottled water to families with infants. Measured levels were caused by iodine-131 (I-131) and were 103, 137 and 174 Bq/L. On 24 March, iodine-131 was detected in 12 of 47 prefectures, of which the level in Tochigi was the highest at 110 Bq/kg. Caesium-137 was detected in 6 prefectures but always below 10 Bq/kg. On 25 March, tap water was reported to have reduced to 79 Bq/kg and to be safe for infants in Tokyo and Chiba but still exceeded limits in Hitachi and Tokaimura. On 27 April, "radiation in Tokyo's water supply fell to undetectable levels for the first time since 18 March."

The following graphs show Iodine-131 water contaminations measured in water purifying plants From 16 March to 7 April:

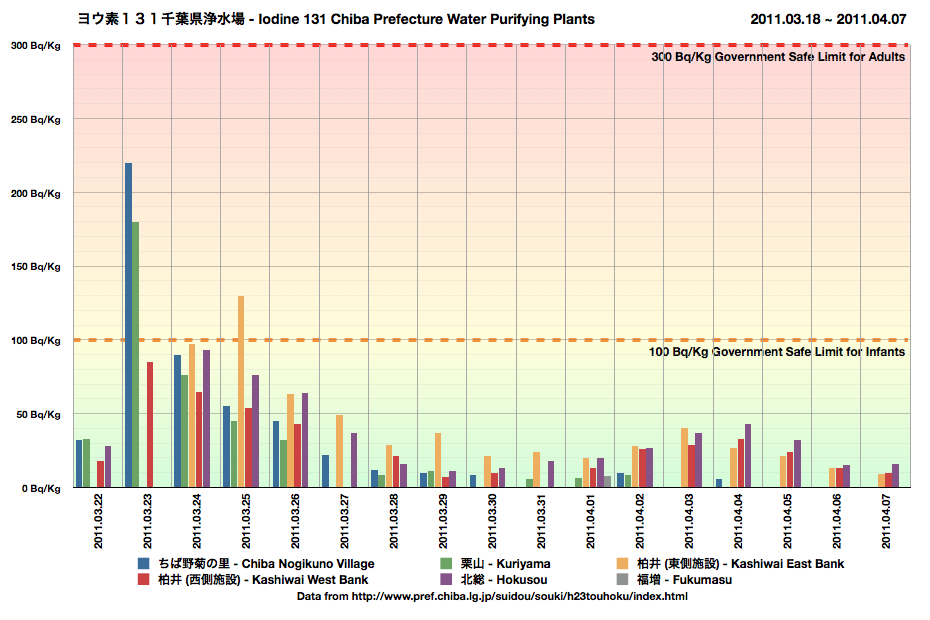
Chiba Prefecture

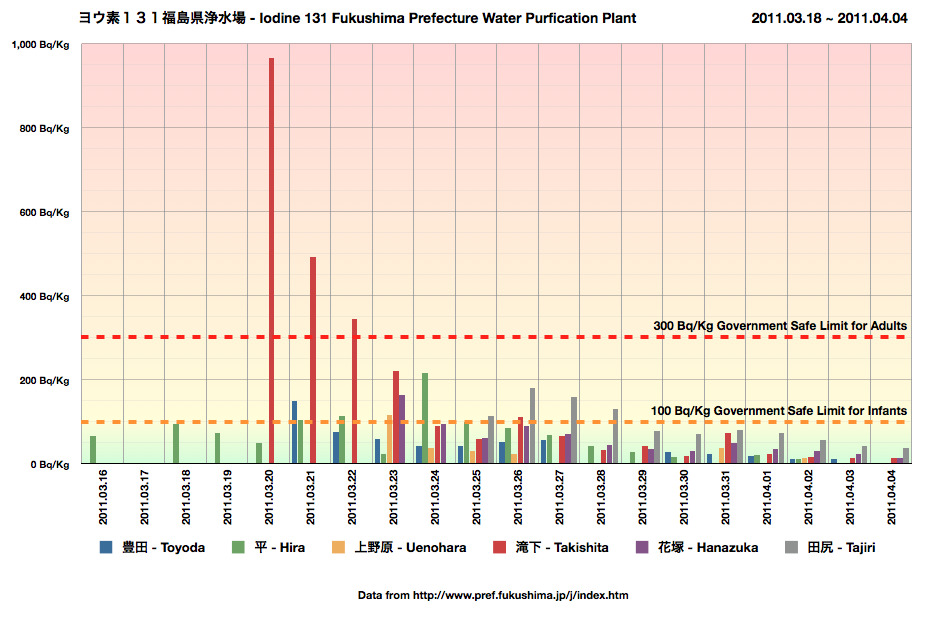
Fukushima Prefecture

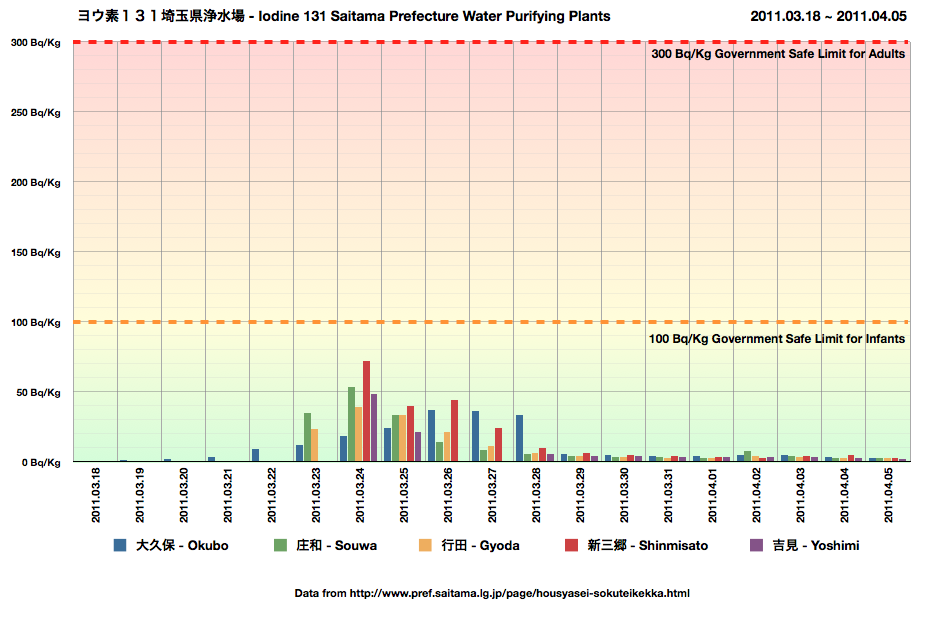
Saitama Prefecture

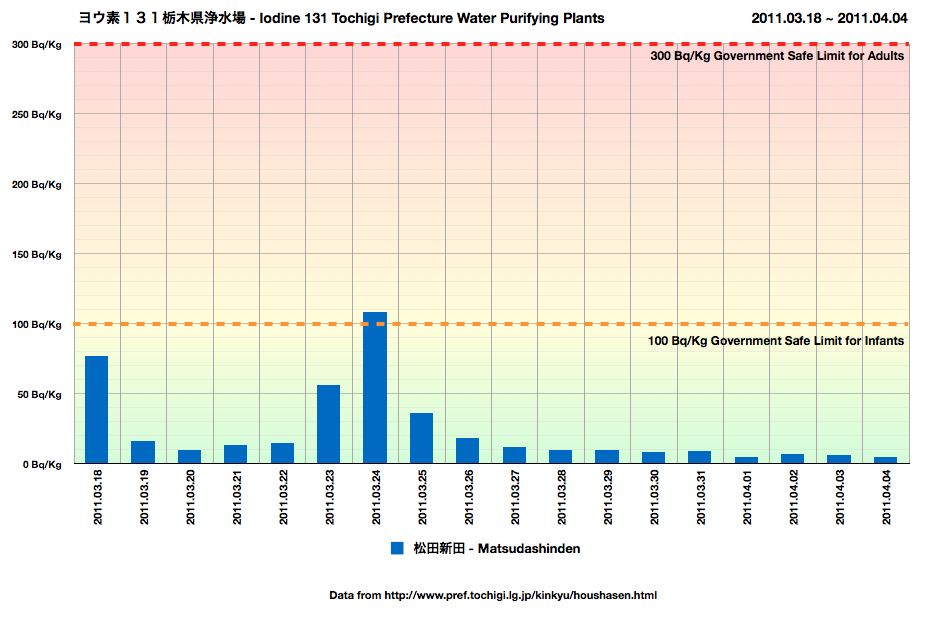
Tochigi Prefecture

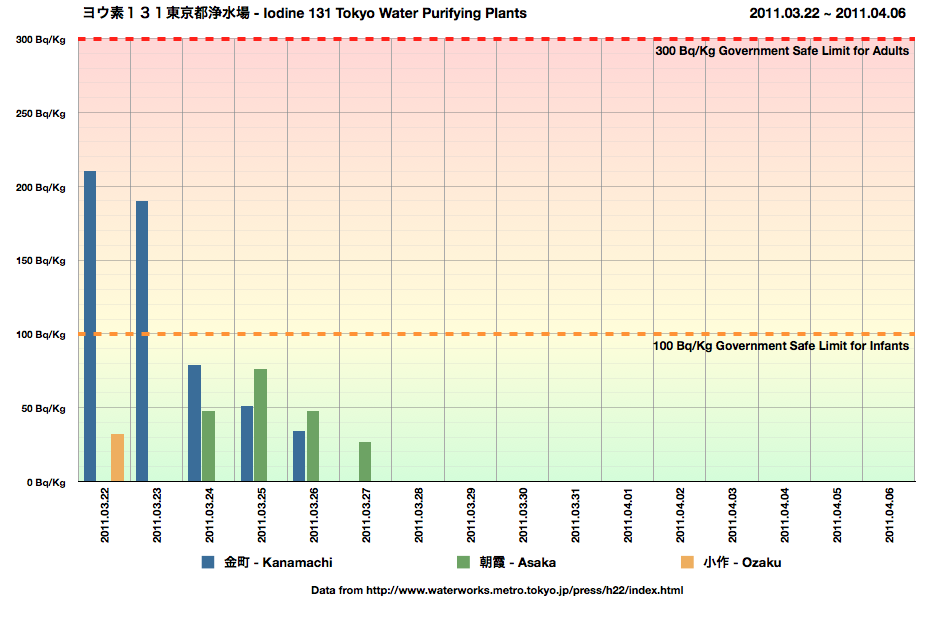
Tokyo Prefecture

On 2 July samples of tapwater taken in Tokyo Shinjuku ward radioactive caesium-137 was detected for the first time since April. The concentration was 0.14 becquerel per kilogram and none was discovered yesterday, which compares with 0.21 becquerel on 22 April, according to the Tokyo Metropolitan Institute of Public Health. No caesium-134 or iodine-131 was detected. The level was below the safety limit set by the government. "This is unlikely to be the result of new radioactive materials being introduced, because no other elements were detected, especially the more sensitive iodine", into the water supply, were the comments of Hironobu Unesaki, a nuclear engineering professor at Kyoto University.

==== Breast milk ====
Small amounts of radioactive iodine were found in the breast milk of women living east of Tokyo. However, the levels were below the safety limits for tap water consumption by infants. Regulatory limits for infants in Japan are several levels of magnitude beneath what is known to potentially affect human health. Radiation protection standards in Japan are currently stricter than international recommendations and the standards of most other states, including those in North America and Europe. By Nov 2012, no radioactivity was detected in Fukushimas mothers breast milk. 100% of samples contained no detectable amount of radioactivity.

==== Baby-milk ====
Mid November 2011 radioactive caesium was found in milk-powder for baby-food produced by the food company Meiji Co. Although this firm was warned about this matter three times, the matter was taken seriously by its consumer service after it was approached by Kyodo News. Up to 30.8 becquerels per kilogram was found in Meiji Step milk powder. While this is under the governmental safety-limit of 200 becquerels per kilogram, this could be more harmful for young children. Because of this caesium-contaminated milk powder, the Japanese minister of health Yoko Komiyama said on 9 December 2011 at a press conference, that her ministry would start regularly tests on baby food products in connection with the Fukushima Daiichi nuclear plant crisis, every three months and more frequently when necessary. Komiyama said: "As mothers and other consumers are very concerned (about radiation), we want to carry out regular tests", Test done by the government in July and August 2011 on 25 baby products did not reveal any contamination.

==== Children ====
In a survey by the local and central governments conducted on 1,080 children aged 0 to 15 in Iwaki, Kawamata and Iitate on 26–30 March, almost 45 percent of these children had experienced thyroid exposure to radiation with radioactive iodine, although in all cases the amounts of radiation did not warrant further examination, according to the Nuclear Safety Commission on Tuesday 5 July. In October 2011, hormonal irregularities in 10 evacuated children were reported. However, the organization responsible for the study said that no link had been established between the children's condition and exposure to radiation.

On 9 October a survey started in the prefecture Fukushima: ultrasonic examinations were done of the thyroid glands of all 360,000 children between 0 and 18 years of age. Follow-up tests will be done for the rest of their lives. This was done in response to concerned parents, alarmed by the evidence showing increased incidence of thyroid cancer among children after the 1986 Chernobyl disaster. The project was done by the Medical University of Fukushima. The results of the tests will be mailed to the children within a month. At the end of 2014 the initial testing of all children should be completed, after this the children will undergo a thyroid checkup every 2 years until they turn 20, and once every 5 years above that age.

In November 2011 in urine-samples of 1500 pre-school-children (ages 6 years or younger) from the city of Minamisoma in the prefecture Fukushima radioactive caesium was found in 104 cases. Most had levels between 20 and 30 becquerels per liter, just above the detection limit, but 187 becquerels was found in the urine of a one-year-old baby boy. The parents had been concerned about internal exposure. Local governments covered the tests for elementary schoolchildren and older students. According to RHC JAPAN a medical consultancy firm in Tokyo, these levels could not harm the health of the children. But director Makoto Akashi of the National Institute of Radiological Sciences said, that although those test results should be verified, this still proved the possibility of internal exposure in the children of Fukushima, but that the internal exposure would not increase, when all food was tested for radioactivity before consumption.

==== Soil ====
Also in July citizens groups reported that a survey of soil at four places in the city of Fukushima taken on 26 June proved that all samples were contaminated with radioactive caesium, measuring 16,000 to 46,000 becquerels per kilogram and exceeding the legal limit of 10,000 becquerels per kg, A study published by the PNAS found that caesium 137 had "strongly contaminated the soils in large areas of eastern and northeastern Japan."

==== Wildlife ====
After the find of 8,000 becquerels of caesium per kilogram in wild mushrooms, and a wild boar that was found with radioactivity amounts about 6 times the safety limit, Professor Yasuyuki Muramatsu at the Gakushuin University urged detailed checks on wild plants and animals. Radioactive caesium in soil and fallen leaves in forests in his opinion would be easily absorbed by mushrooms and edible plants. He said that wild animals like boars were bound to accumulate high levels of radioactivity by eating contaminated mushrooms and plants. The professor added that detailed studies were on wild plants and animals. Across Europe the Chernobyl-incident had likewise effects on wild fauna and flora.

The first study of the effects of radioactive contamination following the Fukushima nuclear accident suggested, through standard point count censuses that the abundance of birds was negatively correlated with radioactive contamination, and that among the 14 species in common between the Fukushima and the Chernobyl regions, the decline in abundance was presently steeper in Fukushima. However criticism of this conclusion is that naturally there would be less bird species living on a smaller amount of land, that is, in the most contaminated areas, than the number one would find living in a larger body of land, that is, in the broader area.

Scientists in Alaska are testing seals struck with an unknown illness to see if it is connected to radiation from Fukushima.

About a year after the nuclear accident, some Japanese scientists found what they regarded was an increased number of mutated butterflies. In their paper, they said, this was an unexpected finding, as "insects are very resistant to radiation." Since these are recent findings, the study suggests that these mutations have been passed down from older generations. Timothy Jorgensen, of the Department of Radiation Medicine and the Health Physics Program of Georgetown University raised a number of issues with this "simply not credible" paper, in the journal Nature and concluded that the team's paper is "highly suspect due to both their internal inconsistencies and their incompatibility with earlier and more comprehensive radiation biology research on insects".

==== Plankton ====
Radioactive caesium was found in high concentration in plankton in the sea near the Fukushima Daiichi Nuclear Power Plant. Samples were taken up to 60 kilometers from the coast of Iwaki city in July 2011 by scientists of the Tokyo University of Marine Science and Technology. Up to 669 becquerels per kilogram of radioactive caesium was measured in samples of animal plankton taken 3 kilometers offshore. The leader of the research-group Professor Takashi Ishimaru, said that the sea current continuously carried contaminated water southwards from the plant. Further studies to determine the effect on the food-chain and fish would be needed.

==== Building materials ====
Detectable levels of radiation were found in an apartment building in Nihonmatsu, Fukushima, where the foundation was made using concrete containing crushed stone collected from a quarry near the troubled Fukushima Daiichi nuclear power plant, situated inside the evacuation-zone. Of the 12 households living there were 10 households relocated after the quake. After inspection at the quarry – situated inside the evacuation-zone around the nuclear plant—in the town of Namie, Fukushima between 11 and 40 microsieverts of radiation per hour were detected one meter above gravel held at eight storage sites in the open, while 16 to 21 microsieverts were detected in three locations covered by roofs. From this place about 5,200 metric tons of gravel was shipped from this place and used as building material. On 21 January 2012 the association of quarry agents in the prefecture Fukushima asked its members to voluntarily check their products for radioactivity to ease public concerns over radioactive contamination of building materials. The minister of Industry Yukio Edano did instruct TEPCO to pay compensation for the economical damages. Raised radiation levels were found on a number of buildings constructed after the quake. Schools, private houses, roads. Because of the public anger raised by these finds. the government of Nihonmatsu, Fukushima decided to examine all 224 city construction projects started after the quake. Some 200 construction companies received stone from the Namie-quarry, and the material was used in at least 1000 building-sites. The contaminated stone was found in some 49 houses and apartments. Radiation levels of 0.8 mSv per hour were found, almost as high as the radiation levels outside the homes. None of these represents a potential danger to human health.

On 22 January 2012, the Japanese government survey had identified around 60 houses built with the radioactive contaminated concrete. Even after 12 April 2011, when the area was declared to be an evacuation zone, the shipments continued, and the stone was used for building purposes.

In the first weeks of February 2012 up to 214,200 becquerels of radioactive caesium per kilogram was measured in samples gravel in the quarry near Namie, situated inside the evacuation zone. The gravel stored outside showed about 60,000–210,000 becquerels of caesium in most samples. From the 25 quarries in the evacuation zones, up to 122,400 becquerels of radioactive caesium was found at one that has been closed since the nuclear crisis broke out on 11 March 2011. In one quarry, that is still operational 5,170 becquerels per kilogram was found. Inspections were done at some 150 of the 1.100 construction sites, where the gravel form the Namie-quarry was suspected to be used. At 27 locations the radioactivity levels were higher than the surrounding area.

=== Hot spots at school-yards ===
On 6 May 2012 it became known that according to documents of the municipal education board reports submitted by each school in Fukushima Prefecture in April at least 14 elementary schools, 7 junior high and 5 nursery schools so called "hot spots" existed, where the radiation exposure was more than 3.8 microsieverts per hour, resulting in an annual cumulative dose above 20 millisieverts. However all restrictions, that limited the maximum time to three hours for the children to play outside at the playgrounds of the schools, were lifted at the beginning of the new academic year in April by the education board. The documents were obtained by a group of civilians after a formal request to disclose the information. Tokiko Noguchi, the foreman of a group of civilians, insisted that the education board would restore the restrictions.

==== New radioactivity limits for food in Japan ====
On 22 December 2011 the Japanese government announced new limits for radioactive caesium in food. The new norms would be enforced in April 2012.

food	new norm	old limit
rice, meat, vegetables, fish	100 becquerel per kilogram	500 becquerel per kilogram
milk, milk-powder, infant-food	50 becquerel per kilogram	200 becquerel per kilogram
drinking water	10 becquerel per liter	200 becquerel per liter

On 31 March 2012 the Ministry of Health, Labor and Welfare of Japan published a report on radioactive caesium found in food. Between January and around 15 March 2012 at 421 occasions food was found containing more than 100 becquerels per kilogram caesium. All was found within 8 prefectures: Chiba, Fukushima Prefecture (285 finds), Gunma, Ibaraki (36 finds), Iwate, Miyagi, Tochigi (29 finds) and Yamagata. Most times it involved fish: landlocked salmon and flounder, seafood, after this: Shiitake-mushrooms or the meat of wild animals.

In the first week of April 2012 caesium-contamination above legal limits was found in:

- Shiitake mushrooms in Manazuru Kanagawa prefecture situated at 300 kilometers from Fukushima: 141 becquerels/kg
- bamboo-shoots in two cities in Chiba prefecture
- bamboo-shoots and Shiitake-mushrooms in 5 cities in the region Kantō, Ibaraki prefecture

In Gunma prefecture 106 becquerels/kg was found in beef. Sharper limits for meat would be taken effect in October 2012, but in order to ease consumer concern the farmers were asked to refrain from shipping.

== Decontamination efforts ==
In August 2011 Prime Minister Naoto Kan informed the Governor of Fukushima Prefecture about the plans to build a central storage facility to store and treat nuclear waste including contaminated soil in Fukushima. On 27 August at a meeting in Fukushima City Governor Yuhei Sato spoke out his concern about the sudden proposals, and the implications that this would have for the prefecture and its inhabitants, that had already endured so much from the nuclear accident. Kan said, that the government had no intention to make the plant a final facility, but the request was needed in order to make a start with decontamination.

== Distribution outside Japan ==
Short-lived radioactive Iodine-131 isotopes from the disaster were found in giant kelp off of Coastal California, causing no detectable effects to the kelp or other wildlife. All of the radioactive material had dissipated completely within one month of detection.

According to a professor at Stanford, there were some meteorological effects involved and that "81 percent of all the emissions were deposited over the ocean" instead of mainly being spread inland.

=== Distribution by sea ===
Seawater containing measurable levels of iodine-131 and caesium-137 were collected by Japan Agency for Marine-Earth Science and Technology (JAMSTEC) on 22–23 March at several points 30 km from the coastline iodine concentrations were "at or above Japanese regulatory limits" while caesium was "well below those limits" according to an IAEA report on 24 March. On 25 March, IAEA indicated that in the long term, caesium-137 (with a half-life of 30 years) would be the most relevant isotope as far as doses was concerned and indicated the possibility "to follow this nuclide over long distances for several years." The organization also said it could take months or years for the isotope to reach "other shores of the Pacific".

The survey by the Japan Agency for Marine-Earth Science and Technology (JAMSTEC) reveals that radioactive caesium released from Fukushima I Nuclear Power Plant reached the ocean 2000 kilometers from the plant and 5000 meters deep one month after the accident. It is considered that airborne caesium particles fell on the ocean surface, and sank as they were attached to the bodies of dead plankton. The survey result was announced in a symposium held on 20 November in Tokyo. From 18 to 30 April, JAMSTEC collected "marine snow", sub-millimeter particles made mostly of dead plankton and sand, off the coast of Kamchatka Peninsula, 2000 kilometers away from Fukushima, and off the coast of Ogasawara Islands, 1000 kilometers away, at 5000 meters below the ocean surface. The Agency detected radioactive caesium in both locations, and from the ratio of caesium-137 and caesium-134 and other observations it was determined that it was from Fukushima I Nuclear Power Plant. The density of radioactive caesium is still being analyzed, according to the Agency. It has been thus confirmed that radioactive materials in the ocean are moving and spreading not just by ocean currents but by various other means.

=== Distribution by air ===
Fukushima trajectory animation for days 10 to 21 after the accident

The United Nations predicted that the initial radioactivity plume from the stricken Japanese reactors would reach the United States by 18 March. Health and nuclear experts emphasized that radioactivity in the plume would be diluted as it traveled and, at worst, would have extremely minor health consequences in the United States. A simulation by the Belgian Institute for Space Aeronomy indicated that trace amounts of radioactivity would reach California and Mexico around 19 March. These predictions were tested by a worldwide network of highly sensitive radiative isotope measuring equipment, with the resulting data used to assess any potential impact to human health as well as the status of the reactors in Japan. Consequently, by 18 March radioactive fallout including isotopes of iodine-131, iodine-132, tellurium-132, iodine-133, caesium-134 and caesium-137 was detected in air filters at the University of Washington, Seattle, USA.

Favorable westerly winds were dominant during most of the first week of the accident, depositing most of the radioactive material out to sea and away from population centers, with some unfavorable wind directions depositing radioactive material over Tokyo. Low-pressure area over Eastern Japan gave less favorable wind directions 21–22 March. Wind shift to north takes place Tuesday midnight. After the shift, the plume would again be pushed out to the sea for the next becoming days. Roughly similar prediction results are presented for the next 36 hours by the Finnish Meteorological Institute. The winds blowing towards Tokyo were later revealed to have contained cesium microparticles with unknown implications on public health.

Norwegian Institute for Air Research have continuous forecasts of the radioactive cloud and its movement. These are based on the FLEXPART model, originally designed for forecasting the spread of radioactivity from the Chernobyl disaster.

As of 28 April, the Washington State Department of Health, located in the U.S. state closest to Japan, reported that levels of radioactive material from the Fukushima plant had dropped significantly, and were now often below levels that could be detected with standard tests.

== Response in other countries ==
=== Rush for iodine ===
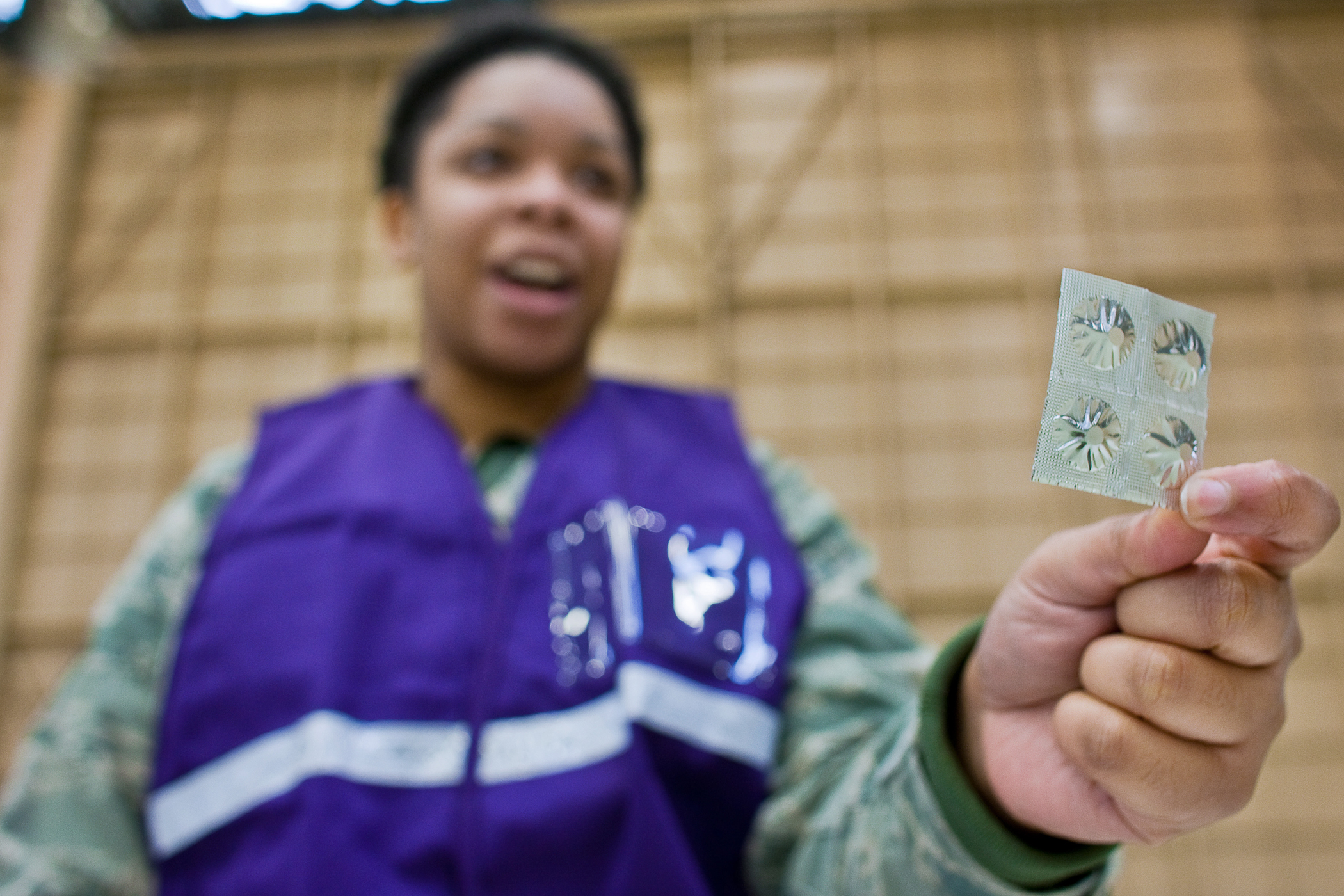
Packaged potassium iodide tablets.

Fear of radiation from Japan prompted a global rush for iodine pills, including in the United States, Canada, Russia, Korea, China, Malaysia and Finland. There was a rush for iodized salt in China. A rush for iodine antiseptic solution appeared in Malaysia. WHO warned against consumption of iodine pills without consulting a doctor and also warned against drinking iodine antiseptic solution. The United States Pentagon said troops were receiving potassium iodide before missions to areas where possible radiation exposure is likely.

The World Health Organisation said it had received reports of people being admitted to poison centres around the world after taking iodine tablets in response to fears about harmful levels of radiation coming out of the damaged nuclear power plant in Fukushima.

=== U.S. military ===
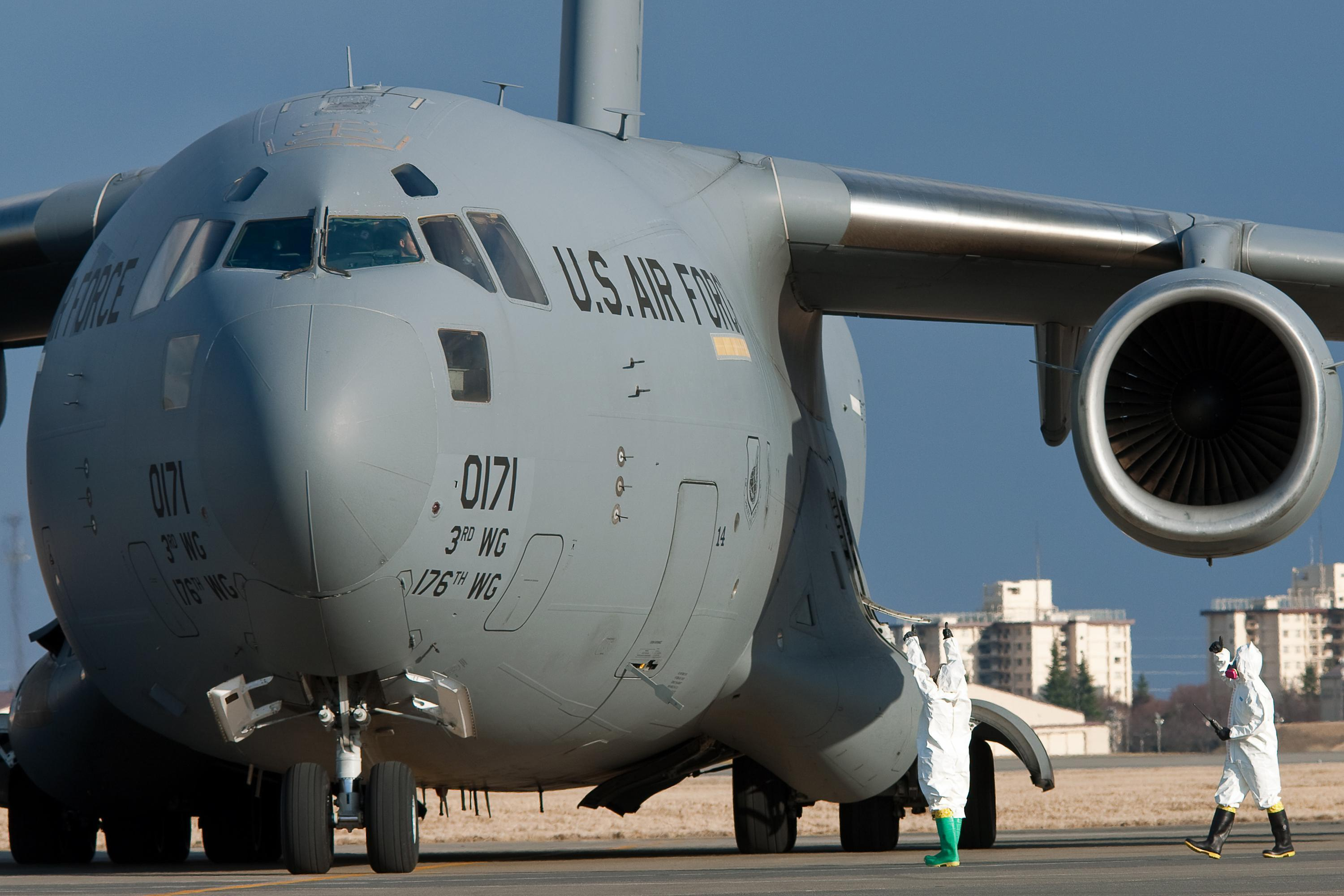
Humanitarian flight is checked for radiation at Yokota

In Operation Tomodachi, the United States Navy dispatched the aircraft carrier USS Ronald Reagan and other vessels in the Seventh Fleet to fly a series of helicopter operations. A U.S. military spokesperson said that low-level radiation forced a change of course en route to Sendai. The Reagan and sailors aboard were exposed to "a month's worth of natural background radiation from the sun, rocks or soil" in an hour and the carrier was repositioned. Seventeen sailors were decontaminated after they and their three helicopters were found to have been exposed to low levels of radioactivity.

The aircraft carrier USS George Washington was docked for maintenance at Yokosuka Naval Base, about 280 kilometres (170 mi) from the plant, when instruments detected radiation at 07:00 JST on 15 March. Rear Admiral Richard Wren stated that the nuclear crisis in Fukushima, 320 kilometres (200 mi) from Yokosuka, was too distant to warrant a discussion about evacuating the base. Daily monitoring and some precautionary measures were recommended for Yokosuka and Atsugi bases, such as limiting outdoor activities and securing external ventilation systems. As a precaution, the Washington was pulled out of its Yokosuka port later in the week. The Navy also temporarily stopped moving its personnel to Japan.

== Isotopes of concern ==
The isotope iodine-131 is easily absorbed by the thyroid. Persons exposed to releases of I-131 from any source have a higher risk for developing thyroid cancer or thyroid disease, or both. Iodine-131 has a short half-life at approximately 8 days, and therefore is an issue mostly in the first weeks after the incident. Children are more vulnerable to I-131 than adults. Increased risk for thyroid neoplasm remains elevated for at least 40 years after exposure. Potassium iodide tablets prevent iodine-131 absorption by saturating the thyroid with non-radioactive iodine. Japan's Nuclear Safety Commission recommended local authorities to instruct evacuees leaving the 20-kilometre area to ingest stable (not radioactive) iodine. CBS News reported that the number of doses of potassium iodide available to the public in Japan was inadequate to meet the perceived needs for an extensive radioactive contamination event.

Caesium-137 is also a particular threat because it behaves like potassium and is taken up by cells throughout the body. Additionally, it has a long, 30-year half-life. Cs-137 can cause acute radiation sickness, and increase the risk for cancer because of exposure to high-energy gamma radiation. Internal exposure to Cs-137, through ingestion or inhalation, allows the radioactive material to be distributed in the soft tissues, especially muscle tissue, exposing these tissues to the beta particles and gamma radiation and increasing cancer risk. Prussian blue helps the body excrete caesium-137.

Strontium-90 behaves like calcium, and tends to deposit in bone and blood-forming tissue (bone marrow). 20–30% of ingested Sr-90 is absorbed and deposited in the bone. Internal exposure to Sr-90 is linked to bone cancer, cancer of the soft tissue near the bone, and leukemia. Risk of cancer increases with increased exposure to Sr-90.

Plutonium is also present in the MOX fuel of the Unit 3 reactor and in spent fuel rods. Officials at the International Atomic Energy Agency say the presence of MOX fuel does not add significantly to the dangers. Plutonium-239 is long-lived and potentially toxic with a half-life of 24,000 years. Radioactive products with long half-lives release less radioactivity per unit time than products with a short half-life, as isotopes with a longer half-life emit particles much less frequently. For example, one mole (131 grams) of ^{131}I releases 6 × 10^{23} decays 99.9% of them within three months, whilst one mole (238 grams) of ^{238}U releases 6 × 10^{23} decays 99.9% of them within 45 billion years, but only about 40 parts per trillion in the first three months. Experts commented that the long-term risk associated with plutonium toxicity is "highly dependent on the geochemistry of the particular site."

=== Regulatory levels ===
An overview for regulatory levels in Japan is shown in the table below:

–	Value	Unit	Reference	Comment
One time exposure of workers	250	mSv		Increased from Japanese limit 100, below international WHO limit of 500
Spinach	2	Bq/g (iodine-131)		possibly a general standard for food
Spinach	0.5	Bq/g (caesium-137)		possibly a general standard for food. Increased from 0.37
Seawater (at discharge)	0.04	Bq/mL (iodine-131)		
Seawater (at discharge)	0.091	Bq/mL (caesium-137)		
drinking water	0.101	Bq/g (iodine-131)		
drinking water	0.20012	Bq/g (caesium-137)		

== Summarised daily events ==
Radiation dose rates during ventings, hydrogen explosions and fires at Fukushima

- On 11 March, Japanese authorities reported that there had been no "release of radiation" from any of the power plants.
- On 12 March, the day after the earthquake, increased levels of iodine-131 and caesium-137 were reported near Unit 1 on the plant site.
- On 13 March, venting to release pressure started at several reactors resulting in the release of radioactive material.
- From 12 to 15 March the people of Namie were evacuated by the local officials to a place in the north of the town. This may have been in an area directly affected by a cloud of radioactive materials from the plants. There are conflicting reports about whether or not the government knew at the time the extent of the danger, or even how much danger there was.
- Chief Cabinet Secretary Yukio Edano announced on 15 March 2011 that radiation dose rates had been measured as high as 30 mSv/h on the site of the plant between units 2 and 3, as high as 400 mSv/h near unit 3, between it and unit 4, and 100 mSv/h near unit 4. He said, "there is no doubt that unlike in the past, the figures are the level at which human health can be affected." Prime Minister Naoto Kan urged people living between 20 and 30 kilometers of the plant to stay indoors, "The danger of further radiation leaks (from the plant) is increasing", Kan warned the public at a press conference, while asking people to "act calmly". A spokesman for Japan's nuclear safety agency said TEPCO had told it that radiation levels in Ibaraki, between Fukushima and Tokyo, had risen but did not pose a health risk. Edano reported that the average radiation dose rate over the whole day was 0.109 μSv/h. 23 out of 150 tested persons living close to the plant were decontaminated
- On 16 March power plant staff were briefly evacuated after smoke rose above the plant and radiation levels measured at the gate increased to 10 mSv/h. Media reported 1,000 mSv/h close to the leaking reactor, with radiation levels subsequently dropping back to 800–600 mSv. Japan's defence ministry criticized the nuclear-safety agency and TEPCO after some of its troops were possibly exposed to radiation when working on the site. Japan's ministry of science (MEXT) measured radiation levels of up to 0.33 mSv/h 20 kilometers northwest of the power plant. Japan's Nuclear Safety Commission recommended local authorities to instruct evacuees leaving the 20-kilometre area to ingest stable (not radioactive) iodine.
- On 17 March IAEA radiation monitoring over 47 cities showed that levels of radiation in Tokyo had not risen. Although at some locations around 30 km from the Fukushima plant, the dose rates had risen significantly in the preceding 24 hours (in one location from 80 to 170 μSv/h and in another from 26 to 95 μSv/h), levels varied according to the direction from the plant. Spinach grown in open air around 75 kilometers south of the nuclear plant had elevated levels of radioactive iodine and caesium
- On 18 March IAEA clarified that, contrary to several news reports, the IAEA had not received any notification from the Japanese authorities of people sickened by radiation contamination.
- On 19 March MEXT said a trace amount of radioactive substances was detected in tap water in Tokyo, as well as Tochigi, Gunma, Chiba and Saitama prefectures. The Japanese Ministry of Health, Labour and Welfare announced that radioactivity levels exceeding legal limits had been detected in milk produced in the Fukushima area and in certain vegetables in Ibaraki. Measurements made by Japan in a number of locations have shown the presence of radionuclides such as iodine-131 (I-131) and caesium-137 (Cs-137) on the ground.
- On 23 March, MEXT released new environmental data. Radioactivity readings for soil and pond samples were highest at one location 40 km northwest of the plant. On 19 March, upland soil there contained 28.1 kBq/kg of Cs-137 and 300 kBq/kg of I-131. One day later, these same figures were 163 kBq/kg of Cs-137 and 1,170 kBq/kg of I-131. Cs-137 of 163 kBq/kg is equal to 3,260 kBq/m^{2}.
- On 24 March, three workers were exposed to high levels of radiation which caused two of them to require hospital treatment after radioactive water seeped through their protective clothes while working in unit 3. It rained in Tokyo from the morning of 21 March to 24 March. The rain brought radioactive fallout there. In Shinjuku, based on the research by Tokyo Metropolitan Institute of Public Health, 83900 Bq/m^{2} of I-131, 6310 Bq/m^{2} of Cs-134, and 6350 Bq/m^{2} of Cs-137 were detected for these four days in total as radioactive fallout, including 24 hours from 20 March 9:00 am to 21 March 9:00 am.
- On 25 March the German Ministry of the Environment announced that small amounts of radioactive iodine had been observed in three places within the German atmosphere.
- On 26 March, Japan's nuclear safety agency said that contamination from iodine-131 in seawater near the discharge had increased to 1,850 times the limit.
- 27 March: Levels of "over 1000" (the upper limit of the measuring device) and 750 mSv/h were reported from water within unit 2 (but outside the containment structure) and 3 respectively. A statement that this level was "ten million times the normal level" in unit 2 was later retracted and attributed to iodine-134 rather than to a longer-lived element. Japan's Nuclear and Industrial Safety Agency indicated that "The level of radiation is greater than 1,000 millisieverts. It is certain that it comes from atomic fission [...]. But we are not sure how it came from the reactor."
- 29 March: iodine-131 levels in seawater 330m south of a key discharge outlet had reached 138 Bq/mL (3,355 times the legal limit)
- 30 March: iodine-131 concentrations in seawater had reached 180 Bq/mL at a location 330m south of a plant discharge, 4,385 times the legal limit. Tests indicating 3.7 MBq/m^{2} of Cs-137 caused the IAEA to state that its criteria for evacuation were exceeded in the village of Iitate, Fukushima, outside the existing 30 kilometres (19 miles) radiation exclusion zone.
- On 31 March, IAEA corrected the value of iodine-131 that had been detected in the Iitate village to 20 million Bq/m^{2}. The value that had been announced at a press interview was about 2 million Bq/m^{2}.
- On 1 April, besides leafy vegetables and parsley, also beef with iodine-131 and/or caesium-134 and caesium-137 levels above the regulatory limit was reported.
- 3 April: Health officials reported radioactive substances higher than the legal limits were found in mushrooms. The Japanese government publicly stated that it expected ongoing radioactive-material releases for "months" assuming normal containment measures were used.
- 4 to 10 April TEPCO announced it had begun dumping 9,100 tons of water that was 100 times the contamination limit from a wastewater treatment plant, and dumping would take 6 days.
- 5 April: Fish caught 50 miles off the coast of Japan had radioactivity exceeding safe levels.
- 15 April: Iodine-131 in seawater was measured at 6,500 times the legal limit, while levels of caesium-134 and caesium-137 rose nearly fourfold, possibly due to installation of steel plates meant to reduce the possibility of water leaking into the ocean.
- 18 April: High levels of radioactive strontium-90 were discovered in soil at the plant, prompting the government to begin regularly testing for the element.
- 22 April: The Japanese government asked residents to leave Iitate and four other villages within a month due to radiation levels.

== See also ==
- Fukushima 50
- Hibakusha (surviving victims of the atomic bombings of Hiroshima and Nagasaki)
- Lists of nuclear disasters and radioactive incidents

== Sources ==
- Health risk assessment from the nuclear accident after the 2011 Great East Japan earthquake and tsunami, based on a preliminary dose estimation. World Health Organization. 2013. ISBN 978-92-4-150513-0.
