= Surface-to-surface intersection problem =

Basic workflow in computer-aided geometric design

The surface-to-surface intersection (SSI) problem is a basic workflow in computer-aided geometric design: Given two intersecting surfaces in R^{3}, compute all parts of the intersection curve. If two surfaces intersect, the result will be a set of isolated points, a set of curves, a set of overlapping surfaces, or any combination of these cases. Because exact solutions can be found only for some special surface classes, approximation methods must be used for the general case.
