= CFD-DEM =

Fluid dynamics modelling process

The CFD-DEM model, or Computational Fluid Dynamics / Discrete Element Method model, is a process used to model or simulate systems combining fluids with solids or particles. In CFD-DEM, the motion of discrete solids or particles phase is obtained by the Discrete Element Method (DEM) which applies Newton's laws of motion to every particle, while the flow of continuum fluid is described by the local averaged Navier–Stokes equations that can be solved using the traditional Computational Fluid Dynamics (CFD) approach. The interactions between the fluid phase and solids phase is modeled by use of Newton's third law. Coupling CFD and DEM methods allows to study Lagrangian statistics by tracking individual particles.

According to the grid-to-particle size ratio, CFD–DEM coupling approaches are commonly classified into resolved, semi-resolved, and unresolved methods. In resolved CFD–DEM coupling, the CFD grid size is substantially smaller than the particle diameter. Grid-to-particle size ratios of approximately 0.1–0.125 are typically required to achieve grid-independent results. In this framework, hydrodynamic forces acting on particles are obtained by directly integrating pressure and viscous stresses over particle surfaces. Common numerical techniques include the Immersed boundary method (IBM) and the Fictitious domain method (FDM), among others.

In semi-resolved and unresolved CFD–DEM approaches, fluid–particle interactions are represented through closure models rather than direct resolution of the flow field around individual particles. Commonly employed force models include drag forces (e.g., Schiller–Naumann, Gidaspow, Di Felice, and Koch–Hill-Ladd), added mass force (virtual mass forces), Magnus effect/force, buoyance, lubrication forces, and turbulence-induced forces. For Model A coupling as defined by Zhou et al. (2010), pressure-gradient force and viscous forces constitute essential components of the momentum exchange formulation.

In unresolved CFD–DEM coupling, the grid size is typically larger than the particle diameter, and grid-to-particle size ratios greater than approximately three are generally recommended to ensure reliable predictions. Semi-resolved coupling occupies an intermediate regime between resolved and unresolved approaches, with grid-to-particle size ratios commonly ranging from approximately 0.3 to 3. In this framework, kernel-based approximation, often employing Gaussian function or similar weighting functions, are used to reconstruct local background quantities such as fluid velocity, temperature, and fluid volume fraction. These reconstructed fields are subsequently used to evaluate momentum and heat transfer between particles and the surrounding fluid, thereby improving the estimation of interphase exchange processes that depend on relative particle–fluid quantities, such as velocity and temperature differences.

CFD–DEM coupling has been widely applied to a variety of natural and industrial particulate-flow systems, including fluidized beds, pneumatic conveying, chemical reactors, additive manufacturing processes, sediment transport, sedimentation, slurry transport, powder mixing and granulation, filtration systems, pharmaceutical manufacturing, mineral processing, and geophysical mass flows such as debris flows and landslides. For example, the direct incorporation of CFD into DEM to study the gas fluidization process so far has been attempted by Tsuji et al. and most recently by Hoomans et al., Deb et al. and Peng et al. A recent overview over fields of application was given by Kieckhefen et al.

== Parallelization ==
OpenMP has been shown to be more efficient in performing coupled CFD-DEM calculations in parallel framework as compared to MPI by Amritkar et al. Recently, a multi-scale parallel strategy is developed. Generally, the simulation domain is divided into many sub-domains and each process calculates only one sub-domain using MPI passing boundary information; for each sub-domain, the CPUs are used to solve the fluid phase while the general purpose GPUs are used to solve the movement of particles. However, in this computation method CPUs and GPUs work in serial. That is, the CPUs are idle while the GPUs are calculating the solid particles, and the GPUs are idle when the CPUs are calculating the fluid phase. To further accelerate the computation, the CPU and GPU computing can be overlapped using the shared memory of a Linux system. Thus, the fluid phase and particles can be calculated at the same time.

== Reducing computation cost using Coarse Grained Particles ==
The computation cost of CFD-DEM is huge due to a large number of particles and small time steps to resolve particle-particle collisions. To reduce computation cost, many real particles can be lumped into a Coarse Grained Particle (CGP). The diameter of the CGP is calculated by the following equation:

$$d_{CGP} = d_{realParticle} \cdot W^{1/3},$$

where $W$ is the number of real particles in CGP. Then, the movement of CGPs can be tracked using DEM. In simulations using Coarse Grained Particles, the real particles in a CGP are subjected to the same drag force, same temperature and same species mass fractions. The momentum, heat and mass transfers between fluid and particles are firstly calculated using the diameter of real particles and then scaled by $W$ times. The value of $W$ is directly related to computation cost and accuracy. When $W$ is equal to unity, the simulation becomes DEM-based achieving results that are of the highest possible accuracy. As this ratio increases, the speed of the simulation increases drastically but its accuracy deteriorates. Apart from an increase in speed, general criteria for selecting a value for this parameter is not yet available. However, for systems with distinct mesoscale structures, like bubbles and clusters, the parcel size should be small enough to resolve the deformation, aggregation, and breakage of bubbles or clusters. The process of lumping particles together reduces the collision frequency, which directly influences the energy dissipation. To account for this error, an effective restitution coefficient was proposed by Lu et al., based on kinetic theory of granular flow, by assuming the energy dissipation during collisions for the original system and the coarse grained system are identical.

$$e_{CGP} = \sqrt{1+\left(e_{realParticle}^2-1\right)W^{1/3}}$$
