= NGC 5121 =

Galaxy in the constellation Centaurus

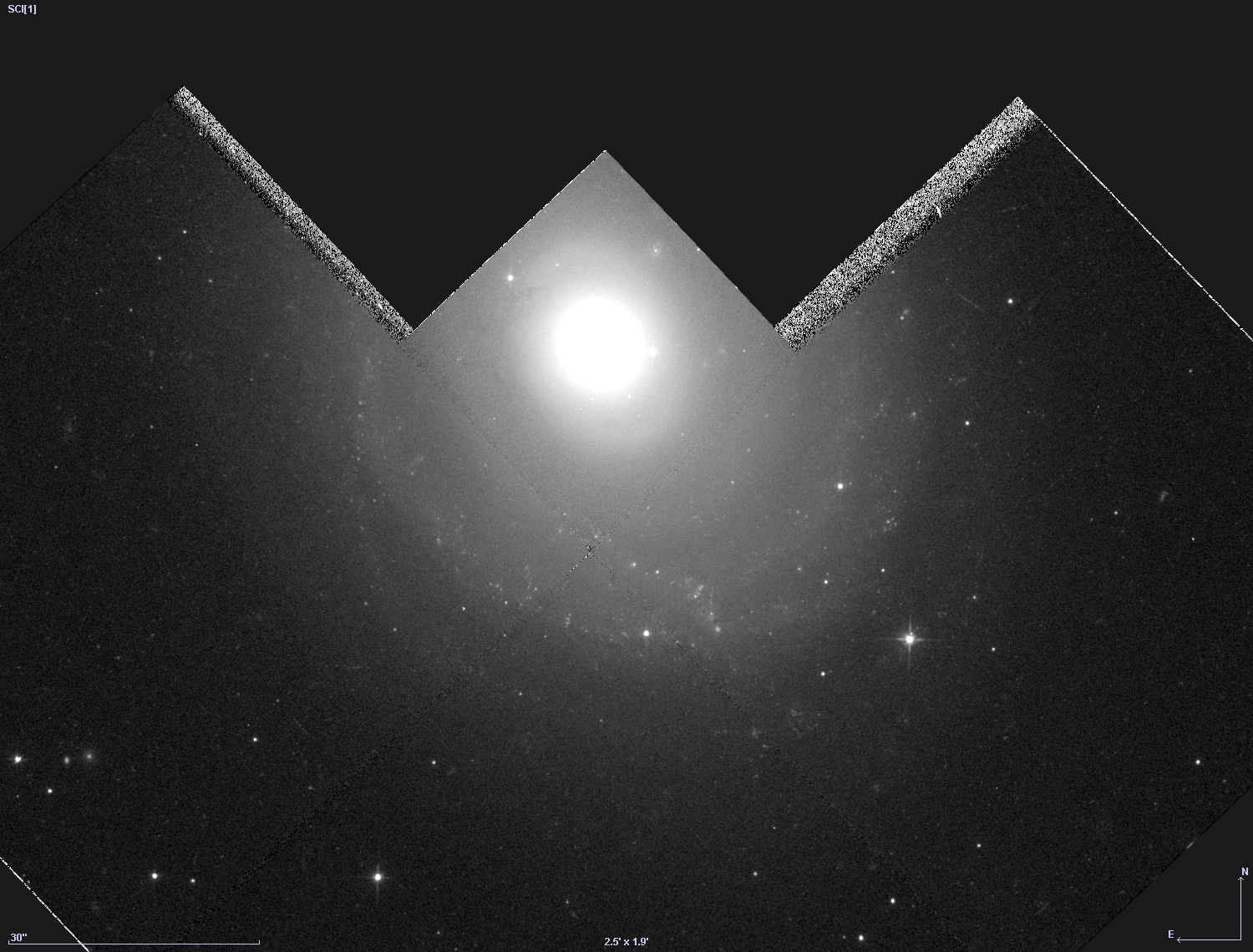
- NGC 5121 imaged by Hubble Space Telescope

Observation data (J2000 epoch)
- Constellation: Centaurus
- Right ascension: 13^{h} 24^{m} 45.6245^{s}
- Declination: −37° 40′ 55.852″
- Redshift: 0.004913 ± 0.000023
- Heliocentric radial velocity: 1,473 ± 7 km/s
- Distance: 82 ± 6.7 Mly (25.15 ± 2.1 Mpc)
- Group or cluster: NGC 5121 Group
- Apparent magnitude (V): 10.7

Characteristics
- Type: SA(rs)a
- Size: ~55,000 ly (17 kpc) (estimated)
- Apparent size (V): 1.9′ × 1.5′

Other designations
- ESO 382- G 057, AM 1321-372, IRAS 13219-3725, MCG -06-29-035, PGC 46896

NGC 5121 is an unbarred spiral galaxy in the constellation Centaurus. The galaxy lies about 80 million light years away from Earth, which means, given its apparent dimensions, that NGC 5121 is approximately 55,000 light years across. It was discovered by John Herschel on June 26, 1834.

The galaxy has a bright nucleus, which is inactive. The nuclear region appears elongated, maybe due to the presence of a bar. The isophotes of the bulge appear circular towards the centre but become elliptical at its outer regions. The galaxy is unbarred. The bulge is surrounded by a low surface brightness disk. The disk features a spiral pattern with multiple tightly wound spiral arms. The spiral pattern is subtle and thus the galaxy had been classified in the past as a lenticular galaxy.

NGC 5121 is the foremost galaxy of the NGC 5121 Group, also known as LGG 349. Other members of the group include ESO 382- 45, ESO 324- 23, ESO 382- 31, NGC 5121A, and ESO 324- 26.
