= NGC 1700 =

Galaxy in the constellation Eridanus

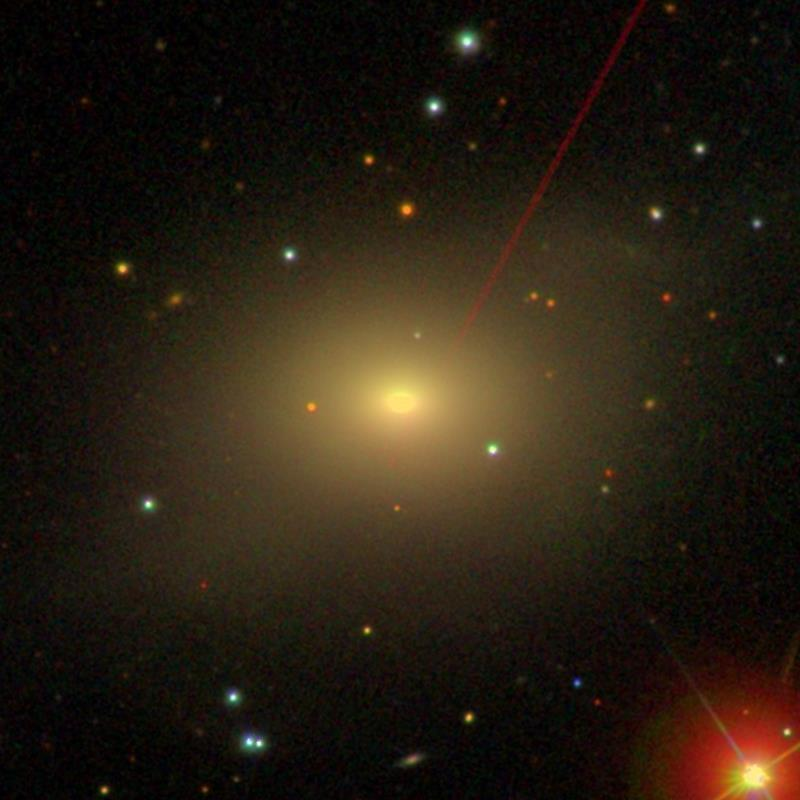
- NGC 1700 by SDSS

Observation data (J2000 epoch)
- Constellation: Eridanus
- Right ascension: 04^{h} 56^{m} 56.2^{s}
- Declination: −04° 51′ 57″
- Redshift: 0.013006 ± 0.000007
- Heliocentric radial velocity: 3,899 ± 2 km/s
- Distance: 117 ± 40 Mly (36.0 ± 12.2 Mpc)
- Apparent magnitude (V): 11.2

Characteristics
- Type: E4
- Apparent size (V): 3.3′ × 2.1′
- Notable features: Post-merger galaxy

Other designations
- MCG -1-13-38, PGC 16386

NGC 1700 is an elliptical galaxy located in the constellation Eridanus. It is located at a distance of about 120 million light years from Earth based on redshift-independent methods, which, given its apparent dimensions, means that NGC 1700 is about 110,000 light years across. Based on its redshift, the galaxy sits roughly 170 million light years away from the Sun. It was discovered by William Herschel on October 5, 1785.

== Characteristics ==
NGC 1700 is an elliptical galaxy that formed after the merger of at least two galaxies. The galaxy has boxy isophotes and has two broad tidal tails or plumes extending towards the north-west and south-east of the galaxy for about 165 arcseconds, which corresponds to 41,000 parsecs (130,000 ly) at the distance of the galaxy. A faint shell system is visible in the central 25 arcseconds of the galaxy. Chaotic dust clouds have been observed within two arcseconds from the centre of the galaxy. They lie at an angle of 45 degrees with respect to the major axis of the galaxy. The presence of two symmetrical tails indicates that the galaxy was formed from two spiral galaxies, or possibly a spiral galaxy and an elliptical galaxy. Based on the morphology of the tails, Brown estimated in 2000 the merger took place 3.2 ± 1.5 billion years ago, while Schweizer and Seitzer estimated in 1992 it took place 6 billion years ago.

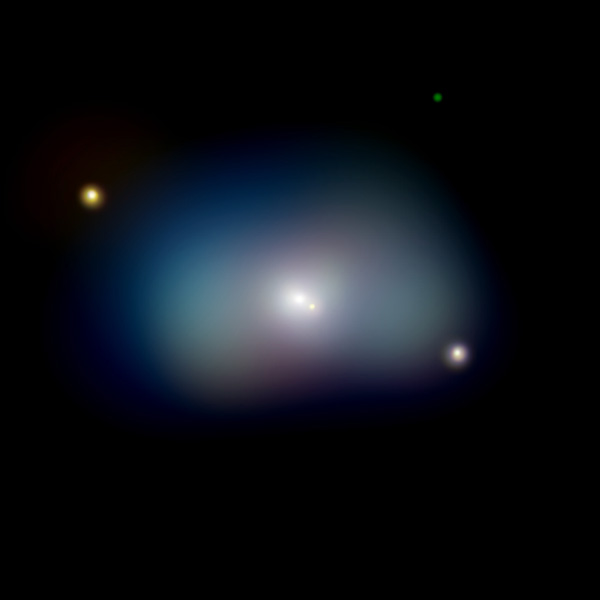
Chandra image of the elliptical galaxy NGC 1700 showing the hot gas disk

Observations of the galaxy by the Chandra X-ray Observatory revealed the presence of an extended disk of hot gas with a diameter of 90,000 light years glowing in X-rays. Upon discovery, it was the largest disk of hot gas known. The disk appears flattened at the outer parts of the galaxy, indicating it is rotating. The temperature of the gas is estimated to be 0.47 ± 0.03 keV. The hot gas disk was accreted during the merger and given the gas cooling rate, the merger took place 3 billion years ago. The rotation implies it continues to carry its initial momentum.

The Hubble Space Telescope found 146 globular clusters in NGC 1700. The globular clusters with an apparent magnitude brighter than 24.5 show a twin peak distribution in color, at V−I=0.85 ± 0.05 and V−I=1.15 ± 0.05, which were also present in images taken by the Keck Observatory, where 312 globular clusters were detected. The blue population has similar color to the globular clusters in Milky Way and is representative of old metal-poor clusters, while the red population has higher metallicity, higher than the solar one, and is younger, with an estimated age of 2.5 to 5 billion years by Brown et al, while Trancho et al estimated an age of 1.7 ± 0.8 billion years for the younger clusters.

The stellar population in the core of the galaxy is younger than the rest of the galaxy, having an estimated age of about 6 billion years. The stars in the core are rotating at the opposite direction as the rest of the galaxy, and the core is characterised as kinematically decoupled. It is possible this characteristic is the result of the accretion of a smaller counter-rotating companion galaxy in an event separate from that which created the tidal tails. Statler et al estimated that the merger which resulted in the kinematically decoupled core took place 2 to 4 billion years ago. In the centre of the galaxy lies a supermassive black hole whose mass is estimated to be about 425 million M_{☉} based on the bulge mass-black hole mass relation.

== Nearby galaxies ==
NGC 1700 belongs to a galaxy group known as LGG 123. Other members of the group include the galaxies NGC 1729, NGC 1741, IC 2102, and IC 399. NGC 1699 lies at a projected distance of 6.5 arcminutes.
