= FLEXPART =

The FLEXible PARTicle dispersion model (FLEXPART) is a Lagrangian Particle Dispersion Model used to simulate air parcel trajectories. It can be run in either forward or backward mode. The forward mode is typically used to determine the downwind concentration or mixing ratio of pollutants. The backward mode can be used to estimate footprint areas to determine the origin of observed emissions.

== History ==
FLEXPART has inherited large portions of its code from its predecessor, FLEXTRA (FLEXible TRAjectory model). The first version of FLEXPART was released in 1998 and was considered free software. Since the release of version 8.2 in 2010, the code has been distributed under the GNU General Public License (GPL) Version 3. Due to a growing user base, the main developers decided to provide an online platform for developers and modellers, which was launched together with the release of version 9.0 in June 2012.

In addition to main FLEXPART code, several branches have been developed for use with mesoscale meteorological models. In particular, FLEXPART-WRF was created to work with the open source WRF model. The first version of FLEXPART-WRF was presented in 2006 by Jerome D. Fast and Richard C. Easter. The model was later renamed the "PNNL Integrated Lagrangian Transport" (PILT) model since the code base started to deviate extensively from the main FLEXPART branch. In 2007, a new technical report was presented where the model was once again referred to as FLEXPART-WRF. At this time, there were still a number of important features missing in FLEXPART-WRF (which were available in FLEXPART). A number of research groups started developing FLEXPART-WRF on their own, in 2011, there were three separate projects on GitHub, each with a partial goal to implement a scheme for wet deposition.

In 2013, a major update of FLEXPART-WRF was released with support from the FLEXPART developers, the release included a working wet deposition scheme as well as new run-time options for wind fields and turbulence. The code was also parallelized with compile-time options for OpenMP and MPI added to the previous default serial mode. Furthermore, an option to use the NetCDF standard format for output was added.
