= Isophote =

Curve on an illuminated surface through points of equal brightness

ellipsoid with isophotes (red)

In geometry, an isophote is a curve on an illuminated surface that connects points of equal brightness. One supposes that the illumination is done by parallel light and the brightness b is measured by the following scalar product:

$$b(P)= \vec n(P)\cdot \vec v=\cos\varphi$$

where $\vec n(P)$ is the unit normal vector of the surface at point P and $\vec v$ the unit vector of the light's direction. If b(P) = 0, i.e. the light is perpendicular to the surface normal, then point P is a point of the surface silhouette observed in direction $\vec v.$ Brightness 1 means that the light vector is perpendicular to the surface. A plane has no isophotes, because every point has the same brightness.

In astronomy, an isophote is a curve on a photo connecting points of equal brightness.

== Application and example ==
In computer-aided design, isophotes are used for checking optically the smoothness of surface connections. For a surface (implicit or parametric), which is differentiable enough, the normal vector depends on the first derivatives. Hence, the differentiability of the isophotes and their geometric continuity is 1 less than that of the surface. If at a surface point only the tangent planes are continuous (i.e. G1-continuous), the isophotes have there a kink (i.e. is only G0-continuous).

In the following example (s. diagram), two intersecting Bezier surfaces are blended by a third surface patch. For the left picture, the blending surface has only G1-contact to the Bezier surfaces and for the right picture the surfaces have G2-contact. This difference can not be recognized from the picture. But the geometric continuity of the isophotes show: on the left side, they have kinks (i.e. G0-continuity), and on the right side, they are smooth (i.e. G1-continuity).

Isophotes on two Bezier surfaces and a G1-continuous (left) and G2-continuous (right) blending surface: On the left the isophotes have kinks and are smooth on the right

== Determining points of an isophote ==
=== On an implicit surface ===
For an implicit surface with equation $f(x,y,z)=0,$ the isophote condition is $\frac{\nabla f \cdot \vec v}{|\nabla f|}= c \ .$ That means: points of an isophote with given parameter c are solutions of the nonlinear system
$$\begin{align}
f(x,y,z) &= 0, \\[4pt]
\nabla f (x,y,z)\cdot \vec v -c\;|\nabla f(x,y,z)| &= 0,
\end{align}$$
which can be considered as the intersection curve of two implicit surfaces. Using the tracing algorithm of Bajaj et al. (see references) one can calculate a polygon of points.

=== On a parametric surface ===
In case of a parametric surface $\vec x= \vec S(s,t)$ the isophote condition is

$\frac{(\vec S_s\times\vec S_t)\cdot\vec v}{|\vec S_s\times\vec S_t|}=c\ .$

which is equivalent to $\ (\vec S_s\times\vec S_t)\cdot\vec v- c\;|\vec S_s\times\vec S_t|=0 \ .$ This equation describes an implicit curve in the s-t-plane, which can be traced by a suitable algorithm (see implicit curve) and transformed by $\vec S(s,t)$ into surface points.

== See also ==
- Contour line
